This list of Conus species is a listing of species in the genus Conus, a genus of sea snails, specifically cone snails, marine gastropod mollusks in the family Conidae.

For many years, all of the cone snails were placed in the genus Conus. More recently a large number of species have been moved to other genera.

This list with about 800 accepted species relies on the taxonomy used in the World Register of Marine Species and the publication in 2015 by Puillandre N., Duda T.F., Meyer C., Olivera B.M. & Bouchet P. (2015). One, four or 100 genera? A new classification of the cone snails. Journal of Molluscan Studies. 81: 1-23

Species
Species within the genus Conus:

A

 Conus abbas Hwass in Bruguière, 1792
 Conus abbreviatus Reeve, 1843
 Conus abrolhosensis Petuch, 1987
† Conus abruptus Marshall, 1918
 Conus achatinus Gmelin, 1791
 Conus acutangulus Lamarck, 1810
 Conus adami Wils, 1988
 Conus adamsonii Broderip, 1836
 Conus admirationis Poppe & Tagaro, 2015
 Conus advertex (Garrard, 1961)
† Conus adversarius Conrad 1840
† Conus aemulator A. P. Brown & Pilsbry, 1911
 Conus aemulus Reeve, 1844
 Conus aequiquadratus Monnier, Tenorio, Bouchet & Puillandre, 2018
 Conus africanus Kiener, 1845
 Conus aito Rabiller & Richard, 2014
 Conus alabaster Reeve, 1849
 Conus alainallaryi Bozzetti & Monnier, 2009
 Conus albellus Röckel & Korn, 1990
 Conus albuquerquei Trovão, 1978
 Conus alconnelli da Motta, 1986
 Conus alexandrei (Limpalaër & Monnier, 2012)
 Conus alexandrinus Kaicher, 1977
 Conus alexisallaryi (Cossignani, 2018)
 Conus alfi (Thach, 2016)
 Conus algoensis G. B. Sowerby I, 1834
 Conus aliwalensis (S. G. Veldsman, 2018)
 Conus allaryi Bozzetti, 2008
 Conus alrobini (Thach, 2016)
 Conus amadis Gmelin, 1791
 Conus ambiguus Reeve, 1844
 Conus ammiralis Linnaeus, 1758
 Conus amphiurgus Dall, 1889
 Conus amplus Röckel & Korn, 1992
 Conus anabathrum Crosse, 1865
 Conus anabelae Rolán & Röckel, 2001
 Conus andamanensis E. A. Smith, 1879
 Conus andremenezi Olivera & Biggs, 2010
 Conus anemone Lamarck, 1810
 Conus angasi Tryon, 1884
 Conus angeluquei (Tenorio, Abalde & Zardoya, 2018)
 Conus angioiorum Röckel & Moolenbeek, 1992
 Conus annegretae Schönherr, 2018
 † Conus anningae Hendricks, 2015 
 Conus anosyensis Bozzetti, 2008
 Conus antoniaensis (Cossignani & Fiadeiro, 2014)
 Conus antonioi (Cossignani, 2014)
 Conus antoniomonteiroi Rolán, 1990
 Conus aplustre Reeve, 1843
 Conus arafurensis (Monnier, Limpalaër & Robin, 2013)
 Conus araneosus sensu Lightfoot, 1786
 Conus arangoi Sarasúa, 1977
 Conus archiepiscopus Hwass in Bruguière, 1792
 Conus archon Broderip, 1833
 Conus ardisiaceus Kiener, 1845
 Conus arenatus Hwass in Bruguière, 1792
 Conus ariejoostei (S. G. Veldsman, 2016)
 Conus aristophanes G. B. Sowerby II, 1857
 Conus armadillo Shikama, 1971
 † Conus armoricus Suter, 1917 
 Conus artoptus G. B. Sowerby I, 1833
 Conus asiaticus da Motta, 1985
 Conus ateralbus Kiener, 1845
 Conus athenae Filmer, 2011
 Conus atimovatae (Bozzetti, 2012)
 Conus attenuatus Reeve, 1844
 Conus augur sensu Lightfoot, 1786
 Conus aulicus Linnaeus, 1758
 Conus aurantius Hwass in Bruguière, 1792
 Conus auratinus da Motta, 1982
 Conus aureonimbosus Petuch, 1987 
 Conus aureopunctatus Petuch, 1987
 Conus aureus Hwass in Bruguière, 1792
 Conus auricomus Hwass in Bruguière, 1792
 Conus aurisiacus Linnaeus, 1758
 Conus australis (Holten, 1802)
 Conus austroviola Röckel & Korn, 1992
 Conus axelrodi Walls, 1978

B 

 Conus babaensis Rolán & Röckel, 2001
 Conus bahamensis Vink & Röckel, 1995
 Conus baeri Röckel & Korn, 1992
 Conus bairstowi G. B. Sowerby III, 1889
 Conus balabacensis Filmer, 2012
 Conus balerensis Olivera, Saguil & Bouchet, 2019
 Conus balteatus G. B. Sowerby I, 1833
 Conus bandanus Hwass in Bruguière, 1792
 Conus baochauae Thach, 2020
 Conus barbara Brazier, 1898 
 Conus barbieri G. Raybaudi Massilia, 1995
 Conus barrosensis (Cossignani & Fiadeiro, 2017)
 Conus barthelemyi Bernardi, 1861
 Conus bartschi G. D. Hanna & Strong, 1949
 Conus bayani Jousseaume, 1872
 Conus bayeri Petuch, 1987
 Conus beatrix Tenorio, Poppe, & Tagaro, 2007
 Conus behelokensis Lauer, 1989
 Conus belairensis Pin & Leung Tack in Pin, 1989
 Conus belizeanus (Petuch & Sargent, 2011)
 † Conus bellacoensis Hendricks, 2015 
 Conus bellocqae van Rossum, 1996
 Conus bellulus Rolán, 1990
 Conus bengalensis (Okutani, 1968)
 Conus berdulinus Veillard, 1972
 Conus bessei Petuch, 1992
 Conus betulinus Linnaeus, 1758
 Conus biancae Bozzetti, 2010
 Conus biliosus (Röding, 1798)
 Conus binghamae Petuch, 1987
 Conus blanfordianus Crosse, 1867
 Conus blatteus Shikama, 1979
 Conus boavistensis Rolán & Fernandez in Rolán, 1990
 Conus bocagei Trovão, 1978
 Conus boeticus Reeve, 1844
 Conus bondarevi Röckel & G. Raybaudi Massilia, 1992
 Conus bonfigliolii (Bozzetti, 2010) 
 Conus borgesi Trovão, 1979
 Conus boui da Motta, 1988
 Conus boutetorum Richard & Rabiller, 2013
 Conus brandonensis (Lorenz, 2019)
 Conus bratcherae (Petuch & Berschauer, 2019)
 Conus brianhayesi Korn, 2002
 Conus brianoi (Cossignani & Allary, 2019)
 Conus broderipii Reeve, 1844
 Conus bruguieri Kiener, 1846
 Conus brunneobandatus Petuch, 1992
 Conus brunneofilaris Petuch, 1990
 Conus brunneus Wood, 1828
 Conus bruuni Powell, 1958
 Conus bulbus Reeve, 1843
 Conus bullatus Linnaeus, 1758
 Conus buniatus (Bozzetti, 2013)
 Conus burryae Clench, 1942
 Conus buxeus (Röding, 1798)
 Conus byssinus (Röding, 1798)

C 

 Conus cacao Ferrario, 1983
 † Conus cacellensis Pereira da Costa, 1866 
 † Conus cadonensis Lyell & G. B. Sowerby II in Lyell, 1840
 Conus caillaudii Kiener, 1845
 Conus calhetae Rolan, 1990
 Conus canariensis (Tenorio, Abalde, Pardos-Blas & Zardoya, 2020)
 Conus calhetinensis (Cossignani & Fiadeiro, 2014)
 Conus cancellatus Hwass in Bruguière, 1792
 Conus canonicus Hwass in Bruguière, 1792
 Conus capitanellus Fulton, 1938
 Conus capitaneus Linnaeus, 1758
 Conus capreolus Röckel, 1985
 Conus caracteristicus Fischer von Waldheim, 1807
 Conus carcellesi Martins, 1945
 Conus cardinalis Hwass in Bruguière, 1792
 Conus cargilei Coltro, 2004
 Conus carioca Petuch, 1986
 † Conus carlottae Hendricks, 2015 
 Conus carnalis G. B. Sowerby III, 1879
 † Conus cashi Hendricks, 2015 
 Conus castaneus Kiener, 1848
 Conus cathyae (Monnier, Limpalaër & Prugnaud, 2020)
 Conus catus Hwass in Bruguière, 1792
 Conus caysalensis L. Raybaudi & Prati, 1994 
 Conus cazalisoi (Cossignani & Fiadeiro, 2018)
 Conus cebuensis Wils, 1990
 Conus cedonulli Linnaeus, 1758
 Conus cepasi Trovão, 1975
 Conus ceruttii Cargile, 1997
 Conus cervus Lamarck, 1822
 Conus chaldaeus (Röding, 1798)
 Conus chiangi (Azuma, 1972)
 Conus chiapponorum Lorenz, 2004
 Conus chytreus Tryon, 1884 
 Conus ciderryi da Motta, 1985
 Conus cinereus Hwass in Bruguière, 1792
 Conus cingulatus Lamarck, 1810
 Conus circumactus Iredale, 1929
 Conus circumcisus Born, 1778
 Conus clarus E. A. Smith, 1881
 Conus classiarius Hwass in Bruguière, 1792 
 Conus clavatulus d'Orbigny, 1852 
 Conus clerii Reeve, 1844
 Conus cloveri Walls, 1978
 Conus cocceus Reeve, 1844
 Conus coccineus Gmelin, 1791
 Conus coelinae Crosse, 1858
 Conus coffeae Gmelin, 1791
 Conus collisus Reeve, 1849
 Conus colmani Röckel & Korn, 1990
 Conus colombi (Monnier & Limpalaër, 2012)
 Conus colombianus Petuch, 1987
 Conus coltrorum (Petuch & R. F. Myers, 2014)
 Conus compressus G. B. Sowerby II, 1866 Tentatively listed as a valid species
 Conus conco Puillandre, Stöcklin, Favreau, Bianchi, Perret, Rivasseau, Limpalaër, Monnier & Bouchet, 2015
 Conus consors G. B. Sowerby I, 1833
 Conus conspersus Reeve, 1844
 Conus corallinus Kiener, 1845
 Conus corbieri Blöcher, 1994
 Conus cordigera G. B. Sowerby II, 1866
 Conus coronatus Gmelin, 1791
 Conus cossignanii (Cossignani & Fiadeiro, 2014)
 Conus costellatus Grateloup, 1835
 Conus cristinapessoae (Cossignani & Fiadeiro, 2017)
 Conus crocatus Lamarck, 1810
 Conus crosnieri (Tenorio, Monnier & Puillandre, 2018)
 Conus crotchii Reeve, 1849
 Conus cumingii Reeve, 1848
 Conus cuna Petuch, 1998
 Conus cuneolus Reeve, 1843
 Conus curassaviensis Hwass in Bruguière, 1792
 Conus curralensis Rolán, 1986
 Conus cuvieri Crosse, 1858
 Conus cyanostoma A. Adams, 1855
 Conus cylindraceus Broderip & G. B. Sowerby I, 1830
 Conus cymbioides Tenorio, Bouchet & Puillandre, 2018

D 

 Conus dalli Stearns, 1873
 Conus damottai Trovão, 1979
 Conus dampierensis Coomans & Filmer, 1985
 Conus dangdami Thach, 2017
 Conus danilai Röckel & Korn, 1990
 Conus daphne Boivin, 1864
 Conus darkini Röckel, Korn, & Richard, 1993
 Conus daucus Hwass in Bruguière, 1792
 Conus dayriti Röckel & da Motta, 1983
 Conus decolrobertoi (Cossignani & Fiadeiro, 2017)
 Conus decoratus Röckel, Rolán & Monteiro, 1980
 Conus dedonderi (Goethaels & D. Monsecour, 2013)
 Conus delanoyae Trovão, 1979
 Conus demisgeraldoi (Cossignani & Fiadeiro, 2018)
 Conus denizi Afonso & Tenorio, 2011
 Conus deprinsi Thach, 2020
 Conus desiradensis Rabiller & Richard, 2019
 Conus desidiosus A. Adams, 1855
 Conus desiradensis Rabiller & Richard, 2019
 Conus devorsinei (Petuch, Berschauer & Poremski, 2015) 
 Conus deynzerorum Petuch, 1995
 Conus diadema G. B. Sowerby I, 1834
 Conus dianthus G. B. Sowerby III, 1882
 Conus diegoi (Cossignani, 2014)
 Conus diminutus Trovão & Rolán, 1986
 Conus dispar G. B. Sowerby I, 1833
 Conus distans Hwass in Bruguière, 1792
 Conus dominicanus Hwass in Bruguière, 1792
 Conus donnae Petuch, 1998
 Conus dorotheae Monnier & Limpalaër, 2010
 Conus dorreensis Péron, 1807
 Conus duffyi Petuch, 1992
 Conus ducphuongi Thach, 2017
 Conus dusaveli (H. Adams, 1872)

E

 Conus easoni (Petuch & Berschauer, 2018)
 Conus ebraeus Linnaeus, 1758
 Conus eburneus Hwass in Bruguière, 1792 
 Conus echinophilus (Petuch, 1975)
 Conus echo Lauer, 1989 
 Conus edaphus (Dall, 1910)
 Conus ednae (Petuch, 2013)
 Conus edwardpauli Petuch, 1998
 Conus eldredi Morrison, 1955
 Conus eleutheraensis (Petuch, 2013)
 Conus emaciatus Reeve, 1849
 Conus empressae Lorenz, 2001
 Conus encaustus Kiener, 1845
 Conus episcopatus Da Motta, 1982
 Conus equiminaensis Schönherr, 2018
 Conus ermineus Born, 1778
 Conus ernesti Petuch, 1990
 Conus erythraeensis Reeve, 1843
 Conus escondidai Poppe & Tagaro, 2005
 Conus espingueirensis (Cossignani & Fiadeiro, 2017)
 Conus estellae Cossignani, 2020
 Conus estivali Röckel, Richard, & Moolenbeek, 1995
 Conus eusebioi Schönherr, 2018
 Conus evansi Bondarev, 2001
 Conus eversoni Petuch, 1987
 Conus excelsus G. B. Sowerby III, 1908
 Conus exiguus Lamarck, 1810
 Conus eximius Reeve, 1849
 Conus explorator Vink, 1990

F 

 Conus felitae Rolán, 1990
 Conus felix Fenzan, 2012
 Conus fergusoni G. B. Sowerby II, 1873
 Conus fernandesi Tenorio, Afonso & Rolán, 2008
 Conus ferrugineus Hwass in Bruguière, 1792
 Conus figulinus Linnaeus, 1758
 Conus fijisulcatus Moolenbeek, Röckel & Bouchet, 2008
 Conus filmeri Rolán & Röckel, 2000
 Conus fischoederi Röckel & da Motta, 1983
 Conus flamingo Petuch, 1980
 Conus flammeacolor Petuch, 1992
 Conus flavescens G. B. Sowerby I, 1834
 Conus flavidus Lamarck, 1810
 Conus flavus Röckel, 1985
 Conus flavusalbus Rolán & Röckel, 2000
 Conus floccatus G. B. Sowerby I, 1841
 Conus floridulus A. Adams & Reeve, 1848
 Conus fonsecai (Petuch & Berschauer, 2016)
 Conus fosteri Clench & Aguayo, 1942
 Conus fragilissimus Petuch, 1979
 Conus franciscanus Hwass in Bruguière, 1792
 Conus franciscoi Rolán & Röckel, 2000
  † Conus franklinae Hendricks, 201
 Conus fraserorum (Lorenz, 2020)
 Conus freitasi (Tenorio, Afonso, Rolán, Pires, Vasconcelos, Abalde & Zardoya, 2018)
 Conus frigidus Reeve, 1848
 Conus fulmen Reeve, 1843
 Conus fumigatus Hwass in Bruguière, 1792
 Conus furnae Rolán, 1990 
† Conus furvoides Gabb, 1873
 Conus furvus Reeve, 1843
 Conus fuscatus Born, 1778
 Conus fuscoflavus Röckel, Rolán, & Monteiro, 1980
 Conus fuscolineatus G. B. Sowerby III, 1905
 † Conus fusellinus Suter, 1917

G 

 Conus gabelishi da Motta, 1982
 Conus galeao Rolán, 1990
 Conus galeyi Monnier, Tenorio, Bouchet & Puillandre, 2018
 Conus gallopalvoi (Cossignani & Fiadeiro, 2017)
 Conus garciai da Motta, 1982
 † Conus garrisoni Hendricks, 2015 
 Conus garywilsoni Lorenz & Morrison, 2004
 Conus gattegnoi Poppe & Tagaro, 2017 
 Conus gauguini Richard & Salvat, 1973
 Conus generalis Linnaeus, 1767
 Conus genuanus Linnaeus, 1758
 Conus geographus Linnaeus, 1758
 Conus gibsonsmithorum Petuch, 1986
 Conus gigasulcatus Moolenbeek, Röckel & Bouchet, 2008
 Conus gilvus Reeve, 1849
 Conus giorossii Bozzetti, 2005
 Conus gladiator Broderip, 1833
 Conus glans Hwass in Bruguière, 1792
 Conus glaucus Linnaeus, 1758
 Conus glenni Petuch, 1993
 Conus glicksteini Petuch, 1987
 † Conus globoponderosus (Sacco, 1893)
 Conus gloriakiiensis Kuroda & Itô, 1961
 Conus gloriamaris Chemnitz, 1777
 Conus glorioceanus Poppe & Tagaro, 2009
 Conus goajira Petuch, 1992
 Conus gondwanensis Röckel, Richard, & Moolenbeek, 1995
 Conus gonsalensis (Cossignani & Fiadeiro, 2014)
 Conus gonsaloi (Afonso & Tenorio, 2014)
 Conus goudeyi (Monnier & Limpalaër, 2012)
 † Conus gouldi Hendricks, 2015 
 Conus gracianus da Motta & Blöcher, 1982
 Conus gradatulus Weinkauff, 1875
 Conus gradatus (Wood, 1828)
 Conus grahami Röckel, Cosel & Burnay, 1980
 Conus granarius Kiener, 1847
 Conus grangeri G. B. Sowerby III, 1900
 Conus granulatus Linnaeus, 1758
 Conus granum Röckel & Fischöder, 1985
 Conus gratacapii Pilsbry, 1904
 Conus guanahacabibensis Espinosa & Ortea, 2016
 Conus guanche Lauer, 1993
 Conus gubernator Hwass in Bruguière, 1792
 Conus guinaicus Hwass in Bruguière, 1792

H-I 

 Conus habui Lan, 2002
 Conus hamamotoi Yoshiba & Koyama, 1984
 Conus hamanni Fainzilber & Mienis, 1986
 Conus hanshassi Lorenz & Barbier, 2012
 Conus harasewychi Petuch, 1987 
 Conus harlandi Petuch, 1987
 Conus havanensis Aguayo & Farfante, 1947
 † Conus haytensis G. B. Sowerby I, 1850 
 Conus hazinorum (Petuch & Myers, 2014)
 Conus helgae Blöcher, 1992
 † Conus hendersoni Marwick, 1931  
 † Conus hendricksi (Harzhauser & Landau, 2016) 
 Conus hennequini Petuch, 1993
 Conus hieroglyphus Duclos, 1833
 Conus hilli Petuch, 1990 
 Conus hirasei (Kuroda, 1956)
 Conus hoaraui (Monnier & Limpalaër, 2015)
 Conus honkeri Petuch, 1988
 Conus honkerorum (Petuch & R. F. Myers, 2014)
 Conus huberianus Thach, 2020
 Conus hughmorrisoni Lorenz & Puillandre, 2015
 † Conus humerosus Pilsbry, 1921 
 † Conus hungaricus Hoernes & Auinger, 1879 
 † Conus huttoni (Tate, 1890) 
 Conus hyaena Hwass in Bruguière, 1792
 Conus ignotus Cargile, 1998 
 Conus immelmani Korn, 1998
 Conus imperialis Linnaeus, 1758
 Conus inconstans E. A. Smith, 1877
 Conus indomaris (Bozzetti, 2014)
 Conus inesae (Monteiro, Afonso, Tenorio, Rosado & Pirinhas, 2014)
 Conus infinitus Rolán, 1990
 Conus infrenatus Reeve, 1848
 Conus inscriptus Reeve, 1843
 Conus insulae (Tenorio, Abalde, Pardos-Blas & Zardoya, 2020)
 Conus insularis Gmelin, 1791
 Conus iodostoma Reeve, 1843
 Conus isabelarum Tenorio & Afonso, 2004

J-K 

 Conus jacarusoi Petuch, 1998
 Conus janus Hwass in Bruguière, 1792
 Conus jickelii Weinkauff, 1873
 † Conus jocus (Finlay, 1927) 
 Conus jonsingletoni H. Morrison, 2019
 Conus jorioi (Petuch, 2013)
 Conus josephinae Rolán (Mosquera), 1980
 Conus jourdani da Motta, 1984
 Conus jucundus G. B. Sowerby III, 1887
 Conus judaeus Bergh, 1895
 Conus julieandreae Cargile, 1995
 Conus julii Lienard, 1870
 † Conus kaesleri Hendricks, 2015
 †  Conus kahiko Kohn, 1980
 Conus kaiserae Tenorio, Tucker & Chaney, 2012
 Conus kahlbrocki (Lorenz, 2019)
 Conus kalafuti da Motta, 1987
 † Conus karlschmidti Maury, 1917
 Conus karubenthos Touitou, Puillandre, Bouchet & Clovel, 2020
 Conus kawamurai Habe, 1962
 Conus keatii G. B. Sowerby II, 1858
 Conus kermadecensis Iredale, 1912 
 Conus kersteni Tenorio, Afonso & Rolán, 2008
 Conus kerstitchi Walls, 1978
 Conus kevani Petuch, 1987
 Conus kiicumulus (Azuma, 1982)
 Conus kinoshitai (Kuroda, 1956)
 Conus kintoki Habe & Kosuge, 1970
 Conus kirkandersi Petuch, 1987
 Conus klemae (Cotton, 1953)
 Conus knudseni Sander, 1982
 Conus kostini Filmer et al., 2012
 Conus koukae (Monnier, Limpalaër & Robin, 2013)
 Conus kremerorum Petuch, 1988
 Conus kulkulcan Petuch, 1980
 Conus kuroharai (Habe, 1965)

L 

 Conus lamberti Souverbie, 1877
 Conus lamyi Rabiller & Richard, 2019
 Conus largilliertii Kiener, 1847
 Conus lariniorum (Lorenz, 2020)
 Conus laterculatus G. B. Sowerby II, 1870
 Conus laueri (Monnier & Limpalaër, 2013)
 Conus laurenti Rabiller & Richard, 2019
 Conus lecourtorum (Lorenz, 2011)
 Conus leehmani da Motta & Röckel, 1979
 Conus leekremeri Petuch, 1987
 Conus legatus Lamarck, 1810
 Conus lemniscatus Reeve, 1849
 Conus lenavati da Motta, 1982
 Conus leobottonii Lorenz, 2006
 Conus leobrerai da Motta & Martin, 1982
 Conus leopardus (Röding, 1798)
 † Conus letkesensis (Harzhauser & Landau, 2016) 
 Conus levis (Bozzetti, 2012)
 Conus levistimpsoni (Tucker, 2013)
 Conus leviteni Tucker, Tenorio & Chaney, 2011
 Conus lienardi Bernardi & Crosse, 1861
 Conus lightbourni Petuch, 1986
 Conus limpusi Röckel & Korn, 1990
 Conus lindae Petuch, 1987
 Conus lineopunctatus Kaicher, 1977
 Conus lischkeanus Weinkauff, 1875
 Conus litoglyphus Hwass in Bruguière, 1792
 Conus litteratus Linnaeus, 1758
 Conus lividus Hwass in Bruguière, 1792
 Conus lizardensis Crosse, 1865
 Conus lobitensis Kaicher, 1977
 Conus locumtenens Blumenbach, 1791
 Conus lohri Kilburn, 1972
 † Conus lombardii Hendricks, 2015 
 Conus longilineus Röckel, Rolán & Monteiro, 1980
 Conus lozeti Richard, 1980
 Conus lucaya Petuch, 2000
 Conus luciae Moolenbeek, 1986
 Conus lugubris Reeve, 1849
 Conus luteus G. B. Sowerby I, 1833
 † Conus lyelli Hendricks, 2015 
 Conus lynceus G. B. Sowerby II, 1858

M 

 Conus maculiferus G. B. Sowerby I, 1833
 Conus madagascariensis G. B. Sowerby II, 1858
 Conus madecassinus (Bozzetti, 2012) 
 Conus magellanicus Hwass in Bruguière, 1792
 Conus magnificus Reeve, 1843
 Conus magnottei Petuch, 1987
 Conus magus Linnaeus, 1758
 Conus maioensis Trovão, Rolán & Félix-Alves, 1990
 Conus malabaricus (Monnier, Limpalaër & Tenorio, 2017)
 Conus malacanus Hwass in Bruguière, 1792
 Conus malcolmi (Monnier & Limpalaër, 2015)
 Conus maldivus Hwass in Bruguière, 1792 
 Conus mappa sensu Lightfoot, 1786
 Conus marchionatus Hinds, 1843
 Conus mariaodeteae (Petuch & Myers, 2014)
 Conus marielae Rehder & Wilson, 1975
 Conus marileeae (Harasewych, 2014)
 Conus marimaris (Tenorio, Abalde & Zardoya, 2018)
 Conus marmoreus Linnaeus, 1758
 Conus martensi E. A. Smith, 1884
 Conus martinianus Reeve, 1844
 Conus mascarenensis (Monnier & Limpalaër, 2019)
 † Conus mauryi Finlay, 1927 
 Conus maya (Petuch & Sargent, 2011)
 Conus mcbridei Lorenz, 2005
 Conus medoci Lorenz, 2004
 Conus medvedevi (Monteiro, Afonso, Tenorio, Rosado & Pirinhas, 2014)
 Conus melvilli G. B. Sowerby III, 1879
 Conus mercator Linnaeus,1758
 † Conus miamiensis Petuch, 1986 
 Conus michelcharlesi (Monnier, Limpalaër & Prugnaud, 2020)
 Conus micropunctatus Rolán & Röckel, 2000
 Conus miles Linnaeus, 1758
 Conus milesi E. A. Smith, 1887
 Conus miliaris Hwass in Bruguière, 1792
 Conus milneedwardsi Jousseaume, 1894
 Conus miniexcelsus Olivera & Biggs, 2010
 Conus minnamurra (Garrard, 1961)
 Conus miruchae Röckel, Rolán & Monteiro, 1980
 Conus mitratus Hwass in Bruguière, 1792
 † Conus molis A. P. Brown & Pilsbry, 1911 
 Conus moluccensis Küster, 1838
 Conus monachus Linnaeus, 1758 
 Conus moncuri Filmer, 2005
 Conus monicae (Petuch & Berschauer, 2015)
 Conus monile Hwass in Bruguière, 1792
 Conus monilifer Broderip, 1833
 Conus montillai Röckel, 1985
 Conus moolenbeeki Filmer, 2011
 † Conus moravicus Hoernes & Auinger, 1879 
 Conus moreleti Crosse, 1858
 Conus morrisoni G. Raybaudi Massilia, 1991
 Conus moylani Delsaerdt, 2000
 Conus mozambicus Hwass in Bruguière, 1792
 Conus mpenjatiensis (S. G. Veldsman, 2016)
 Conus mucronatus Reeve, 1843
 Conus mulderi Fulton, 1936
 Conus multiliratus Böse, 1906 †
 Conus muriculatus G. B. Sowerby I, 1833
 Conus mus Hwass in Bruguière, 1792
 Conus musicus Hwass in Bruguière, 1792
 Conus mustelinus Hwass in Bruguière, 1792

N-O 

 Conus nahoonensis (S. G. Veldsman, 2016)
 Conus namocanus Hwass in Bruguière, 1792
 Conus nanshaensis F.-L. Li, 2016
 Conus nanus G.B. Sowerby I & G.B. Sowerby I, 1833
 Conus naranjus Trovão, 1975
 Conus natalaurantius (S. G. Veldsman, 2013)
 Conus natalis G. B. Sowerby II, 1858
 Conus navarroi Rolán, 1986
 Conus negroides Kaicher, 1977
 Conus neptunus Reeve, 1843
 Conus ngai Thach, 2020
 Conus ngocngai Thach, 2017
 Conus nicopuillandrei Rabiller & Richard, 2019
 Conus niederhoeferi Monnier, Limpalaër & Lorenz, 1912
 Conus nielsenae Marsh, 1962
 Conus nigromaculatus Röckel & Moolenbeek, 1992
 Conus nigropunctatus G. B. Sowerby II, 1858 
 Conus nimbosus Hwass in Bruguière, 1792
 Conus nobilis Linnaeus, 1758
 Conus nobrei Trovão, 1975
 Conus nocturnus sensu Lightfoot, 1786
 Conus nodulosus G. B. Sowerby II, 1864
 Conus norai da Motta & G. Raybaudi Massilia, 1992
 Conus norpothi Lorenz, 2015
 Conus nucleus Reeve, 1848
 Conus nunesi Schönherr, 2018
 Conus nussatella Linnaeus, 1758
 Conus nux Broderip, 1833
 Conus nybakkeni Tenorio, Tucker & Chaney, 2012
 Conus obscurus G. B. Sowerby I, 1833
 Conus ochroleucus Gmelin, 1791
 Conus oishii (Shikama, 1977)
 † Conus olssoni Maury, 1917 
 Conus omaria Hwass in Bruguière, 1792
 Conus orion Broderip, 1833
 † Conus ornatissimus K. Martin, 1883 
 Conus ortneri Petuch, 1998
 Conus ostrinus (Tucker & Tenorio, 2011)
 Conus oualeiriensis Rabiller & Richard, 2019
† Conus ozennii Crosse, 1858

P-Q 

 Conus papilliferus G. B. Sowerby I, 1834
 Conus papuensis Coomans & Moolenbeek, 1982
 Conus paraguana Petuch, 1987 
  † Conus paranobilis Petuch, 1991
 Conus parascalaris Petuch, 1987
 Conus parius Reeve, 1844
 Conus parvatus Walls, 1979
  Conus paschalli Petuch, 1998
 Conus patae Abbott, 1971
 Conus patamakanthini Delsaerdt, 1998
 Conus patglicksteinae Petuch, 1987
 Conus patriceae (Petuch & R. F. Myers, 2014)
 Conus patricius Hinds, 1843
 Conus paukstisi Tucker, Tenorio & Chaney, 2011
 Conus paulae Petuch, 1988
 Conus paulkersteni Thach, 2017 
 Conus paumotu Rabiller & Richard, 2014
 Conus pauperculus G. B. Sowerby I, 1834
 Conus pavillardae Cossignani, 2019
 † Conus pelagicus Brocchi 1814
 Conus peli Moolenbeek, 1996
 Conus penchaszadehi Petuch, 1986
 Conus pennaceus Born, 1778
 Conus pergrandis (Iredale, 1937)
 Conus perrineae (Cossignani & Fiadeiro, 2018)
 Conus pertusus Hwass in Bruguière, 1792
 Conus petergabrieli Lorenz, 2006
 Conus petestimpsoni (Petuch & Berschauer, 2016)
 Conus petuchi (Monteiro, Afonso, Tenorio, Rosado & Pirinhas, 2014)
 Conus philippii Kiener, 1845
 Conus philquiquandoni Cossignani, 2020
 Conus pica A. Adams & Reeve, 1848
 Conus pictus Reeve, 1843
 Conus piti Rabiller & Richard, 2019 
 † Conus planiliratus G. B. Sowerby I, 1850
 Conus planorbis Born, 1778
 † Conus platensis Frenguelli, 1946
 Conus plinthis Richard & Moolenbeek, 1988
 Conus polongimarumai Kosuge, 1980
 Conus pomareae (Monnier & Limpalaër, 2014)
 † Conus ponderoaustriacus Sacco, 1893 
 Conus pongo Coomans, Moolenbeek & Wils, 1982
 Conus poormani Berry, 1968
 Conus portobeloensis Petuch, 1990
 Conus potiguar (Petuch & Berschauer, 2019)
 Conus poulosi Petuch, 1993
 Conus praecellens A. Adams, 1855
 Conus praelatus Hwass in Bruguière, 1792
 Conus pretiosus Nevill & Nevill, 1874
 Conus primus Röckel & Korn, 1990
 Conus princeps Linnaeus, 1758
 Conus proximus G. B. Sowerby II, 1859
 Conus pseudaurantius Vink & Cosel, 1985
 Conus pseudimperialis Moolenbeek, Zandbergen, & Bouchet, 2008
  † Conus pseudoarmoricus P. Marshall & R. Murdoch, 1920
 Conus pseudocardinalis Coltro, 2004
 Conus pseudocedonulli Blainville, 1818
 Conus pseudonivifer Monteiro, Tenorio & Poppe, 2004
† Conus pseudotextile Grateloup, 1835
 Conus pulcher [Lightfoot], 1786
 Conus pulicarius Hwass in Bruguière, 1792
 Conus purissimus Filmer, 2011
 Conus purpurascens G. B. Sowerby I, 1833
 Conus purvisi (Cossignani & Fiadeiro, 2017)
 Conus quasidaucus Touitou, Puillandre, Bouchet & Clovel, 2020
 Conus quasimagus (Bozzetti, 2016)
 Conus queenslandis da Motta, 1984
 Conus quercinus Lightfoot, 1786
 Conus quiquandoni Lorenz & Barbier, 2008

R 

 Conus radiatus Gmelin, 1791
 Conus ranonganus da Motta, 1978
 Conus rattus Hwass in Bruguière, 1792
 Conus raulsilvai Rolán, Monteiro & Fernandes, 1998
 Conus rawaiensis da Motta, 1978
 Conus recluzianus Bernardi, 1853
 † Conus recognitus Guppy, 1867 
 Conus recurvus (Broderip, 1833)
 Conus reductaspiralis Walls, 1979
 Conus regius Gmelin, 1791
 Conus regonae Rolán & Trovão in Rolán, 1990
 Conus regularis G. B. Sowerby I, 1833
 Conus reticulatus Born, 1778
 Conus retifer Menke, 1829
 Conus richardbinghami Petuch, 1993
 Conus richardsae Röckel & Korn, 1992 
 Conus richeri Richard & Moolenbeek, 1988
 Conus riosi Petuch, 1986
 Conus ritae Petuch, 1995
 Conus rizali Olivera & Biggs, 2010
 Conus robini (Limpalaër & Monnier, 2012)
 Conus roeckeli Rolán (Mosquera), 1980
 Conus rolani Röckel, 1986
 Conus rosalindensis Petuch, 1998
 Conus rosemaryae Petuch, 1990
 Conus roseorapum G. Raybaudi & da Motta, 1990
 Conus rosi (Petuch & Berschauer, 2015)
 Conus rouxi (Monnier, Limpalaër & Robin, 2013)
 Conus royaikeni (S. G. Veldsman, 2010)
 Conus rufimaculosus Macpherson, 1959
 Conus ruthae (Monnier & Limpalaër, 2013)

S 

 Conus sahlbergi da Motta & Harland, 1986
 Conus sakalava (Monnier & Tenorio, 2017)
 Conus salletae (Cossignani, 2014)
 Conus salzmanni G. Raybaudi-Massilia & Rolán, 1997
 Conus samiae da Motta, 1982
 Conus sandwichensis Walls, 1978 
 Conus sanguineus Kiener, 1850
 Conus sanguinolentus Quoy & Gaimard, 1834
 Conus santaluziensis (Cossignani & Fiadeiro, 2015)
 Conus santanaensis (Afonso & Tenorio, 2014)
 Conus santinii (Monnier & Limpalaër, 2014)
 Conus saragasae Rolán, 1986
 Conus sartii Korn, Niederhöfer & Blöcher, 2002
 † Conus saucatsensis Mayer-Eymar, 1890
 Conus sazanka Shikama, 1970
 Conus scabriusculus Dillwyn, 1817
 Conus scalaris Valenciennes, 1832
 Conus scalarispira (Bozzetti, 2012)
 Conus scalarissimus da Motta, 1988
 Conus scalptus Reeve, 1843
 Conus scopulorum Van Mol, Tursch & Kempf, 1971
 Conus scottjordani (Poppe, Monnier & Tagaro, 2012)
 Conus sculletti Marsh, 1962
 Conus sculpturatus Röckel & da Motta, 1986
 Conus sennottorum Rehder & Abbott, 1951
 Conus sertacinctus Röckel, 1986
  † Conus sewalli Maury, 1917
 Conus shaskyi Tenorio, Tucker & Chaney, 2012
 Conus shikamai Coomans, Moolenbeek & Wils, 1985
 Conus simonis Bozzetti, 2010 
 Conus sinaiensis (Petuch & Berschauer, 2016)
 Conus skoglundae Tenorio, Tucker & Chaney, 2012
 Conus smoesi (Petuch & Berschauer, 2016)
 Conus sogodensis (Poppe, Monnier & Tagaro, 2012)
 Conus solangeae Bozzetti, 2004
 Conus solidus Gmelin, 1791
 Conus solomonensis Delsaerdt, 1992
 Conus spectrum Linnaeus, 1758
 Conus sphacelatus G. B. Sowerby I, 1833
 Conus spiceri Bartsch & Rehder, 1943
 Conus splendidulus G. B. Sowerby I, 1833
 Conus sponsalis Hwass in Bruguière, 1792
 Conus spurius Gmelin, 1791
 Conus stanfieldi Petuch, 1998
 Conus stercusmuscarum Linnaeus, 1758
 Conus stimpsoni Dall, 1902
 Conus stramineus Lamarck, 1810
 Conus straturatus G. B. Sowerby II, 1865
 Conus striatellus Link, 1807
 Conus striatus Linnaeus, 1758
 Conus striolatus Kiener, 1845
 Conus stupa (Kuroda, 1956)
 Conus stupella (Kuroda, 1956)
† Conus subachatinus Crosse, 1858
† Conus subtessellatus d'Orbigny, 1852
 Conus suduirauti Raybaudi Massilia, 2004
 Conus sugillatus Reeve, 1844
 Conus sugimotonis Kuroda, 1928
 Conus sukhadwalai Röckel & da Motta, 1983
 Conus sulcatus Hwass in Bruguière, 1792
 Conus sulcocastaneus Kosuge, 1981
 Conus sunderlandi Petuch, 1987
 Conus suratensis Hwass in Bruguière, 1792
 Conus sutanorcum Moolenbeek, Röckel & Bouchet, 2008
 Conus suturatus Reeve, 1844
 Conus swainsoni Estival & Cosel, 1986
 Conus sydneyensis G. B. Sowerby III, 1887
 † Conus symmetricus G. B. Sowerby I, 1850

T 

 Conus tabidus Reeve, 1844
 Conus tacomae Boyer & Pelorce, 2009
 Conus taeniatus Hwass in Bruguière, 1792
 Conus tagaroae (Limpalaër & Monnier, 2013)
 Conus taitensis Hwass in Bruguière, 1792
 Conus takahashii (Petuch & Berschauer, 2019)
 Conus taphrus Woodring, 1970
 Conus telatus Reeve, 1848
 Conus tenorioi (Monnier, Monteiro & Limpalaër, 2016)
 Conus tenuilineatus Rolán & Röckel, 2001
 Conus tenuistriatus G. B. Sowerby II, 1858
 Conus terebra Born, 1778
 Conus terryni Tenorio & Poppe, 2004
 Conus tessulatus Born, 1778
 Conus tethys (Petuch & Sargent, 2011)
 Conus textile Linnaeus, 1758
 Conus thachi F. Huber, 2020
 Conus thalassiarchus G. B. Sowerby I, 1834
 Conus theodorei Petuch, 2000
 Conus therriaulti (Petuch, 2013)
 Conus thevenardensis da Motta, 1987
 Conus thomae Gmelin, 1791
 † Conus thorae Finlay, 1927 
 Conus tiaratus G. B. Sowerby I, 1833
 Conus timorensis Hwass in Bruguière, 1792
 Conus tinianus Hwass in Bruguière, 1792
 Conus tisii Lan, 1978
 Conus tonisii (Petuch & Myers, 2014)
 Conus tostesi Petuch, 1986
 Conus tourosensis (Petuch & Berschauer, 2018)
 Conus transkeiensis Korn, 1998
 Conus trencarti Nolf & Verstraeten, 2008
 Conus tribblei Walls, 1977
  † Conus trigonicus Tomlin, 1937
 Conus trigonus Reeve, 1848
 Conus trinitarius Hwass in Bruguière, 1792
 Conus tristensis Petuch, 1987
 Conus trochulus Reeve, 1844
 Conus troendlei Moolenbeek, Zandbergen & Bouchet, 2008
 Conus trovaoi Rolán & Röckel, 2000
 Conus tulipa Linnaeus, 1758
 Conus tuticorinensis Röckel & Korn, 1990
 Conus typhon Kilburn, 1975

U-V 

 Conus uhlei (Petuch, Coltro & Berschauer, 2020)
 Conus unifasciatus Kiener, 1845
 Conus urashimanus Kuroda & Itô, 1961
 Conus vanvilstereni (Moolenbeek & Zandbergen, 2013)
 Conus vappereaui Monteiro, 2009 

 Conus variegatus Kiener, 1845
 Conus varius Linnaeus, 1758
 Conus vautieri Kiener, 1847
 Conus vayssierei Pallary, 1906
 Conus vegaluzi (Monnier, Prugnaud, Limpalaër, 2020)
 Conus velaensis Petuch, 1993
 Conus velliesi (S. G. Veldsman, 2016)
 Conus venezuelanus Petuch, 1987
 Conus ventricosus Gmelin, 1791
 Conus venulatus Hwass in Bruguière, 1792
 Conus verdensis Trovão, 1979
 Conus vexillum Gmelin, 1791
 Conus vezoi Korn, Niederhöfer & Blöcher, 2000
 Conus vezzarochristophei Cossignani, 2018
 Conus vezzaroi (Cossignani, 2016)
 Conus vezzaronellyae (Cossignani, 2018)
 Conus victoriae Reeve, 1843
 Conus vicweei Old, 1973
 Conus vidua Reeve, 1843 
 Conus villepinii Fischer & Bernardi, 1857
 Conus viola Cernohorsky, 1977
 Conus violaceus Gmelin, 1791
 Conus virgatus Reeve, 1849
 Conus virgo Linnaeus, 1758
 Conus visagenus Kilburn, 1974
 Conus vittatus Hwass in Bruguière, 1792
 Conus vitulinus Hwass in Bruguière, 1792
 Conus voluminalis Reeve, 1843
 Conus vulcanus Tenorio & Afonso, 2004

W-Z 

 Conus wallangra (Garrard, 1961)
 Conus wandae (Cossignani, 2014)
 Conus wilsi Delsaerdt, 1998
 Conus wittigi Walls, 1977
 † Conus woodringi Hendricks, 2018 
 Conus xanthicus Dall, 1910
 Conus xanthocinctus Petuch, 1986
 † Conus xenicus Pilsbry & Johnson, 1917
 Conus xhosa (S. G. Veldsman, 2016)
 Conus xicoi Röckel, 1987
 Conus yemenensis Bondarev, 1997
  † Conus zambaensis Hendricks, 2015
 Conus zandbergeni Filmer & Moolenbeek, 2010
 Conus zapatosensis Röckel, 1987
 Conus zebra Lamarck, 1810
 Conus zebroides Kiener, 1845
 Conus zeylanicus Gmelin, 1791
 Conus ziczac Mühlfeld, 1816
 Conus zonatus Hwass in Bruguière, 1792
 Conus zylmanae Petuch, 1998

Species brought into synonymy
 
This list is incomplete.
 Conus aculeiformis Reeve, 1844: synonym of Conasprella aculeiformis (Reeve, 1844)
 Conus acuminatus Hwass in Bruguière, 1792: synonym of Conus locumtenens Blumenbach, 1791
 Conus acutimarginatus G. B. Sowerby II, 1866: synonym of Conasprella jaspidea (Gmelin, 1791)
 Conus acutus G. B. Sowerby II, 1857: synonym of Conus musicus Hwass in Bruguière, 1792
 Conus adansoni sensu G. B. Sowerby II, 1858: synonym of Conus magus Linnaeus, 1758
 Conus adansonii Lamarck, 1810: synonym of Conus ventricosus Gmelin, 1791
 Conus adenensis E. A. Smith, 1891: synonym of Conus inscriptus Reeve, 1843
 Conus adonis Shikama, 1971: synonym of Conasprella memiae (Habe & Kosuge, 1970)
 Conus adriaticus Nardo, 1847: synonym of Conus ventricosus Gmelin, 1791
 Conus adustus G. B. Sowerby II, 1858: synonym of Conus erythraeensis Reeve, 1843
 Conus aegrotus Reeve, 1849: synonym of Conus furvus Reeve, 1843
 Conus affinis Gmelin, 1791: synonym of Conus circumcisus Born, 1778
 Conus agassizii Dall, 1886: synonym of Conasprella mindana (Hwass in Bruguière, 1792)
 Conus agrestis Mörch, 1850: synonym of Conus buxeus loroisii Kiener, 1846
 Conus akabensis G. B. Sowerby III, 1887: synonym of Conus quercinus [Lightfoot], 1786
 Conus albicans G. B. Sowerby II, 1857: synonym of Conus furvus Reeve, 1843
 Conus albomaculatus G. B. Sowerby II, 1841: synonym of Conus litoglyphus Hwass in Bruguière, 1792
 Conus albospira E. A. Smith, 1880: synonym of Conus straturatus G. B. Sowerby II, 1865
 Conus albus G. B. Sowerby III, 1887: synonym of Conus furvus Reeve, 1843
 Conus alexandremonteiroi (Cossignani, 2014): synonym of Conasprella alexandremonteiroi (Cossignani, 2014) 
 Conus alfredensis Bartsch, 1915: synonym of Conus tinianus Hwass in Bruguière, 1792
 Conus alisi Röckel, Richard, & Moolenbeek, 1995: synonym of  Conasprella alisi (Röckel, Richard, & Moolenbeek, 1995)
 Conus allamandi (Petuch, 2013): synonym of Conasprella allamandi (Petuch, 2013) 
 Conus alternatus Link, 1807: synonym of Conus eburneus Hwass in Bruguière, 1792
 Conus altispiratus G. B. Sowerby II, 1873: synonym of Conus mozambicus Hwass in Bruguière, 1792
 Conus alveolus G. B. Sowerby I, 1833: synonym of Conus stramineus Lamarck, 1810
 Conus amabilis Lamarck, 1810: synonym of Conus pertusus Hwass in Bruguière, 1792
 Conus amazonicus Nardo, 1847: synonym of Conus ventricosus Gmelin, 1791
 Conus ambaroides Shikama, 1977: synonym of Conus magus Linnaeus, 1758
 Conus amethystinus Trovão, 1975: synonym of Conus carnalis G. B. Sowerby III, 1879
 Conus amiralis Hwass in Bruguière, 1792: synonym of Conus cedonulli Linnaeus, 1767
 Conus anadema Tomlin, 1937: synonym of Conus splendidulus G. B. Sowerby I, 1833
 Conus anaglypticus Crosse, 1865: synonym of Conasprella anaglyptica (Crosse, 1865) 
 Conus anceps A. Adams, 1855: synonym of Conus consors G. B. Sowerby I, 1833
 Conus andrangae Schwengel, 1955: synonym of Conus bartschi G. D. Hanna & Strong, 1949
 Conus angolensis Paes Da Franca, 1957: synonym of Conus zebroides Kiener, 1848
 Conus angulatus A. Adams, 1855: synonym of Conus regularis G. B. Sowerby I, 1833
 Conus aphrodite Petuch, 1979: synonym of Conasprella aphrodite (Petuch, 1979)
 Conus arabicus Lamarck, 1810: synonym of Conus litteratus Linnaeus, 1758
 Conus arachnoideus Gmelin, 1791: synonym of Conus araneosus [Lightfoot], 1786
 Conus araneosus Hwass, 1792: synonym of Conus araneosus [Lightfoot], 1786
 Conus arausiensis Reeve, 1843: synonym of Conus daucus daucus Hwass in Bruguière, 1792 represented as Conus daucus Hwass in Bruguière, 1792
 Conus arawak (Petuch & R. F. Myers, 2014): synonym of Conasprella arawak (Petuch & R. F. Myers, 2014) 
 Conus arbornatalis da Motta, 1978: synonym of Conus amadis Gmelin, 1791
 Conus archetypus Crosse, 1865: synonym of Conus ziczac archetypus Crosse, 1865
 Conus archiepiscopus Hwass in Bruguière, 1792: synonym of Conus textile Linnaeus, 1758
 Conus architalassus [Lightfoot], 1786: synonym of Conus ammiralis Linnaeus, 1758
 Conus archithalassius Link, 1807: synonym of Conus pulcher [Lightfoot], 1786
 Conus arcuatus Broderip & G. B. Sowerby I, 1829: synonym of Conasprella arcuata (Broderip & G. B. Sowerby I, 1829) 
 Conus armiger Crosse, 1858: synonym of Conasprella armiger (Crosse, 1858)
 Conus articulatus G. B. Sowerby II, 1873: synonym of  Conasprella articulata (G. B. Sowerby II, 1873)
 Conus asper Lamarck, 1810: synonym of Conus sulcatus Hwass in Bruguière, 1792
 Conus aspersus G. B. Sowerby I, 1833: synonym of Conus ermineus Born, 1778
 Conus assimilis A. Adams, 1855: synonym of Conus magus Linnaeus, 1758
 Conus atractus Tomlin, 1937: synonym of Conus compressus G. B. Sowerby II, 1866
 Conus atramentosus Reeve, 1849: synonym of Lovellona atramentosa (Reeve, 1849)
 Conus augur Hwass in Bruguière, 1792: synonym of Conus augur [Lightfoot], 1786
 Conus auratus Hwass in Bruguière, 1792: synonym of Conus aulicus Linnaeus, 1758
 Conus aureolus Sowerby II, 1858: synonym of Conus anabathrum Crosse, 1865
 Conus auricomus Lamarck, 1810: synonym of Conus aureus Hwass in Bruguière, 1792
 Conus aurora Lamarck, 1810: synonym of Conus tinianus Hwass in Bruguière, 1792
 Conus austini Rehder & Abbott, 1951: synonym of Conus cancellatus cancellatus Hwass in Bruguière, 1792 represented as Conus cancellatus Hwass in Bruguière, 1792
 Conus australis Lamarck, 1810: synonym of Conus australis Holten, 1802
 Conus australis Schröter, 1803: synonym of Conus mustelinus Hwass in Bruguière, 1792
 Conus baccatus G. B. Sowerby III, 1877: synonym of Conasprella baccata (G. B. Sowerby III, 1877) 
 Conus badius Kiener, 1845 : synonym of Conus namocanus Hwass in Bruguière, 1792
 Conus baiano Coltro, 2004 : synonym of Conus abrolhosensis Petuch, 1987
 Conus baileyi Röckel & da Motta, 1979: synonym of  Conasprella baileyi (Röckel & da Motta, 1979)
 Conus bajanensis Nowell-Usticke, 1968: synonym of Conasprella bajanensis (Nowell-Usticke, 1968) 
 Conus barbadensis Hwass in Bruguière, 1792 : synonym of Conus miliaris Hwass in Bruguière, 1792
 Conus baylei Jousseaume, 1872 : synonym of Conus spurius baylei Jousseaume, 1872
 Conus beckeri G. B. Sowerby III, 1911 : synonym of Conus pictus Reeve, 1843
 Conus beddomei G. B. Sowerby III, 1901 : synonym of Conus ziczac ziczac Mühlfeld, 1816 represented as Conus ziczac Mühlfeld, 1816
 Conus bermudensis Clench, 1942 : synonym of Conasprella mindana bermudensis (Clench, 1942)
 Conus bernardii Kiener, 1847 : synonym of Conus cinereus Hwass in Bruguière, 1792
 Conus berschaueri (Petuch & R. F. Myers, 2014): synonym of Conasprella berschaueri (Petuch & R. F. Myers, 2014) 
 Conus bertarollae Costa & Simone, 1997 : synonym of Conus ziczac archetypus Crosse, 1865
 Conus bicolor G. B. Sowerby I, 1833 [March] : synonym of Conus litoglyphus Hwass in Bruguière, 1792
 Conus bicolor G. B. Sowerby I, 1833 [July] : synonym of Conus praecellens A. Adams, 1855
 Conus bicolor G. B. Sowerby I, 1833 [May] : synonym of Conus pulcher [Lightfoot], 1786
 Conus bifasciatus G. B. Sowerby II, 1857 : synonym of Conus attenuatus Reeve, 1844
 Conus bifasciatus Gmelin, 1791 : synonym of Conasprella centurio (Born, 1778)
 Conus biraghii (G. Raybaudi, 1992): synonym of Conasprella biraghii (G. Raybaudi Massilia, 1992) 
 Conus bitleri da Motta, 1984 : synonym of Conus cordigera G. B. Sowerby II, 1866
 Conus blainvillei Kiener, 1850 : synonym of Conus fumigatus Hwass in Bruguière, 1792
 Conus blainvillii Vignard, 1829 : synonym of Conus ammiralis Linnaeus, 1758
 Conus blatteus Shikama, 1979 : synonym of Conus viola Cernohorsky, 1977
 Conus bocki G. B. Sowerby III, 1881 : synonym of Conus sulcatus Hwass in Bruguière, 1792
 Conus bodarti Coltro, 2004 : synonym of Conasprella iansa (Petuch, 1979)
 Conus boholensis Petuch, 1979: synonym of Conasprella boholensis (Petuch, 1979)
 Conus boivini Kiener, 1846 : synonym of Conus gubernator Hwass in Bruguière, 1792
 Conus borbonicus H. Adams, 1868 : synonym of Conus tulipa Linnaeus, 1758
 Conus borneensis G. B. Sowerby II, 1866 : synonym of Conus magus Linnaeus, 1758
 Conus borneensis A. Adams & Reeve, 1848: synonym of Conasprella arcuata (Broderip & G. B. Sowerby I, 1829)
 Conus boschi Clover, 1972 : synonym of Conus melvilli G. B. Sowerby III, 1879
 Conus boschorum Moolenbeek & Coomans, 1993: synonym of Pseudolilliconus boschorum (Moolenbeek & Coomans, 1993)
 Conus boubeeae G. B. Sowerby III, 1903 : synonym of Conasprella pusio (Hwass in Bruguière, 1792)
 Conus boucheti Richard, 1983: synonym of Conasprella boucheti (Richard, 1983)
 Conus bougei G. B. Sowerby III, 1907 : synonym of Conus exiguus Lamarck, 1810
 Conus bozzettii Lauer, 1991: synonym of  Conasprella bozzettii (Lauer, 1991)
 Conus branhamae Clench, 1953: synonym of Conasprella jaspidea pealii (Green, 1830)
 Conus brasiliensis Clench, 1942 : synonym of Conus ziczac archetypus Crosse, 1865
 Conus brazieri G. B. Sowerby III, 1881 : synonym of Conus circumcisus Born, 1778
 Conus brettinghami Coomans, Moolenbeek & Wils, 1982 : synonym of Conus sulcatus Hwass in Bruguière, 1792
 Conus breviculus G. B. Sowerby I, 1833 : synonym of Conus pulcher [Lightfoot], 1786
 Conus brevis E. A. Smith, 1877 : synonym of Conus caracteristicus Fischer von Waldheim, 1807
 Conus brontodes Shikama, 1979 : synonym of Conus kinoshitai (Kuroda, 1956)
 Conus bruguieresi Kiener, 1845: synonym of Conus bruguieri Kiener, 1846
 Conus bruguiersi Kiener, 1846 : synonym of Conus bruguieri Kiener, 1846
 Conus buxeus Reeve, 1844 : synonym of Conus furvus Reeve, 1843
 Conus cabritii Bernardi, 1858: synonym of Conus exiguus Lamarck, 1810
 Conus caelatus A. Adams, 1855: synonym of Conus marchionatus Hinds, 1843
 Conus caerulans Küster, 1838: synonym of Conus ermineus Born, 1778
 Conus caerulescens Lamarck, 1810: synonym of Conus cinereus Hwass in Bruguière, 1792
 Conus caffer Krauss, 1848: synonym of Conus mozambicus Hwass in Bruguière, 1792
 Conus caillaudi Jay, 1846: synonym of Conus ventricosus Gmelin, 1791
 Conus cakobaui Moolenbeek, Röckel, & Bouchet, 2008: synonym of Profundiconus cakobaui (Moolenbeek, Röckel & Bouchet, 2008) 
 Conus caledonicus Hwass in Bruguière, 1792: synonym of Conus cedonulli Linnaeus, 1767
 Conus californicus Reeve, 1844: synonym of Californiconus californicus (Reeve, 1844)
 Conus canaliculatus Dillwyn, 1817: synonym of Conus malacanus Hwass in Bruguière, 1792
 Conus candidus Kiener, 1847: synonym of Conus philippii Kiener, 1847
 Conus capricorni Van Mol, Tursch & Kempf, 1967: synonym of Conus cancellatus capricorni Van Mol, Tursch & Kempf, 1967
 Conus caracanus Hwass in Bruguière, 1792: synonym of Conus cedonulli insularis Gmelin, 1791: synonym of Conus cedonulli Linnaeus, 1767
 Conus caribbaeus Clench, 1942: synonym of Conus flavescens caribbaeus Clench, 1942
 Conus carinatus Swainson, 1822: synonym of Conus magus Linnaeus, 1758
 Conus carmeli Tenison-Woods, 1877: synonym of Conus anemone Lamarck, 1810
 Conus carpenteri Crosse, 1865: synonym of Conus litoglyphus Hwass in Bruguière, 1792
 Conus carpenterianus (Gabb, 1865): synonym of Megasurcula carpenteriana (Gabb, 1865)
 Conus castrensis Gould, 1842: synonym of Conus thalassiarchus G. B. Sowerby I, 1834
 Conus castus Reeve, 1844: synonym of Conus daucus daucus Hwass in Bruguière, 1792 represented as Conus daucus Hwass in Bruguière, 1792
 Conus catenatus G. B. Sowerby III, 1879: synonym of Conus granarius Kiener, 1847
 Conus cavailloni Fenaux, 1942: synonym of Conus inscriptus Reeve, 1843
 Conus cebuganus da Motta & Martin, 1982: synonym of Conus australis Holten, 1802
 Conus cecilei Kiener, 1847: synonym of Conus furvus Reeve, 1843
 Conus ceciliae Crosse, 1858: synonym of Conus capitaneus Linnaeus, 1758
 Conus centurio Born, 1778: synonym of Conasprella centurio (Born, 1778) 
 Conus cercadensis Maury, 1917 †: synonym of Conasprella cercadensis (Maury, 1917) †
 Conus cerinus Reeve, 1848: synonym of Conus boeticus Reeve, 1844
 Conus cernicus H. Adams, 1869: synonym of Conus balteatus G. B. Sowerby I, 1833
 Conus cernohorskyi da Motta, 1983: synonym of Conus magus Linnaeus, 1758
 Conus cervus sensu G. B. Sowerby I, 1838: synonym of Conus cuvieri Crosse, 1858
 Conus ceylanensis Hwass in Bruguière, 1792: synonym of Conus musicus Hwass in Bruguière, 1792
 Conus ceylonicus Reeve, 1849: synonym of Conus zeylanicus Gmelin, 1791
 Conus ceylonicus G. B. Sowerby II, 1857: synonym of Conus zeylanicus Gmelin, 1791
 Conus characteristicus Dillwyn, 1817: synonym of Conus caracteristicus Fischer von Waldheim, 1807
 Conus chemnitzii Dillwyn, 1817: synonym of Conus rattus Hwass in Bruguière, 1792
 Conus chenui Crosse, 1857: synonym of Conus ferrugineus Hwass in Bruguière, 1792
 Conus chersoideus Nardo, 1847: synonym of Conus ventricosus Gmelin, 1791
 Conus chinoi Shikama, 1970: synonym of Conus distans Hwass in Bruguière, 1792
 Conus cholmondeleyi Melvill, 1900: synonym of Conus textile Linnaeus, 1758
 Conus chrysocestus Berry, 1968: synonym of Conus xanthicus Dall, 1910
 Conus chusaki da Motta, 1978: synonym of Conus striatus Linnaeus, 1758
 Conus cibielii Kiener, 1849: synonym of Conus gladiator Broderip, 1833
 Conus cidaris Kiener, 1846: synonym of Conus magellanicus Hwass in Bruguière, 1792
 Conus cinctus Swainson, 1822: synonym of Conus circumactus Iredale, 1929
 Conus cinctus Valenciennes, 1832: synonym of Conasprella emarginata (Reeve, 1844)
 Conus cinctus Bosc, 1801: synonym of Conus ventricosus Gmelin, 1791
 Conus cingulatus G. B. Sowerby I, 1825: synonym of Conus adamsonii Broderip, 1836
 Conus cingulum Gmelin, 1791: synonym of Conus quercinus [Lightfoot], 1786
 Conus circae G. B. Sowerby II, 1858: synonym of Conus magus Linnaeus, 1758
 Conus circumclausus Fenaux, 1942: synonym of Conus balteatus G. B. Sowerby I, 1833
 Conus circumsignatus Crosse, 1865: synonym of Conus floccatus G. B. Sowerby I, 1841
 Conus citrinus Kiener, 1846: synonym of Conus cocceus Reeve, 1844
 Conus citrinus Gmelin, 1791: synonym of Conus regius Gmelin, 1791
 Conus clandestinatous Shikama, 1979: synonym of Conus voluminalis Reeve, 1843
 Conus clandestinus Shikama, 1979: synonym of Conus shikamai Coomans, Moolenbeek & Wils, 1985
 Conus clarki Rehder & Abbott, 1951: synonym of Conasprella armiger (Crosse, 1858)
 Conus clenchi Martins, 1945: synonym of Conus lemniscatus Reeve, 1849
 Conus clodianus Nardo, 1847: synonym of Conus ventricosus Gmelin, 1791
 Conus clytospira Melvill & Standen, 1899: synonym of Conus milneedwardsi clytospira Melvill & Standen, 1899
 Conus coelebs Hinds, 1843: synonym of Conus terebra Born, 1778
 Conus coerulescens Schröter, 1803: synonym of Conus ermineus Born, 1778
 Conus coletteae (Petuch, 2013): synonym of Conasprella mcgintyi (Pilsbry, 1955)
 Conus colorovariegatus Kosuge, 1981: synonym of Conus neptunus Reeve, 1843
 Conus colubrinus Lamarck, 1810: synonym of Conus pennaceus Born, 1778
 Conus columba Hwass in Bruguière, 1792: synonym of Conasprella puncticulata columba (Hwass in Bruguière, 1792)
 Conus comatosa Pilsbry, 1904: synonym of Conasprella comatosa (Pilsbry, 1904) 
 Conus communis Swainson, 1840: synonym of Conus textile Linnaeus, 1758
 Conus complanatus G. B. Sowerby II, 1866: synonym of Conus victoriae Reeve, 1843
 Conus comptus A. Adams, 1855: synonym of Conus papilliferus G. B. Sowerby I, 1834
 Conus comptus Gould, 1853: synonym of Conus purpurascens G. B. Sowerby I, 1833
 Conus concatenatus Kiener, 1850: synonym of Conus textile Linnaeus, 1758
 Conus concinnulus Crosse, 1858: synonym of Parametaria dupontii (Kiener, 1846)
 Conus concinnus Broderip, 1833: synonym of Parametaria dupontii (Kiener, 1846)
 Conus concinnus G. B. Sowerby II, 1866: synonym of Conus biliosus (Röding, 1798)
 Conus concolor G. B. Sowerby II, 1841: synonym of Conus hyaena concolor G. B. Sowerby II, 1841
 Conus condensus G. B. Sowerby II, 1866: synonym of Conus canonicus Hwass in Bruguière, 1792
 Conus connectens A. Adams, 1855: synonym of Conus daucus Hwass in Bruguière, 1792
 Conus consanguineus E. A. Smith, 1880: synonym of Conus fergusoni G. B. Sowerby II, 1873
 Conus consul Boivin, 1864: synonym of Conus magus Linnaeus, 1758
 Conus contusus Reeve, 1848: synonym of Conus monachus Linnaeus, 1758
 Conus convolutus G. B. Sowerby II, 1858: synonym of Conus omaria Hwass in Bruguière, 1792
 Conus cooki Brazier, 1870: synonym of Conus aplustre Reeve, 1843
 Conus coralinus Habe & Kosuge, 1970: synonym of Conus klemae (Cotton, 1953)
 Conus corbula G. B. Sowerby II, 1858: synonym of Conus textile Linnaeus, 1758
 Conus coriolisi Röckel, Richard & Moolenbeek, 1995: synonym of Conasprella coriolisi (Röckel, Richard & Moolenbeek, 1995) 
 Conus coromandelicus E. A. Smith, 1894: synonym of Conasprella coromandelica (E. A. Smith, 1894) 
 Conus coronatus Reeve, 1849: synonym of Mitromorpha coronata (Reeve, 1849)
 Conus corrugatus G. B. Sowerby II, 1870: synonym of Conasprella jaspidea (Gmelin, 1791)
 Conus costatus Holten, 1802: synonym of Conus sulcatus Hwass in Bruguière, 1792
 Conus couderti Bernardi, 1860: synonym of Conus erythraeensis Reeve, 1843
 Conus coxeni Brazier, 1875: synonym of Conus cyanostoma A. Adams, 1855
 Conus coxianus G. B. Sowerby III, 1895: synonym of Conus locumtenens Blumenbach, 1791
 Conus crassus G. B. Sowerby II, 1858: synonym of Conus eburneus Hwass in Bruguière, 1792
 Conus crebrisulcatus G. B. Sowerby II, 1857: synonym of Conasprella jaspidea (Gmelin, 1791)
 Conus crenulatus Kiener, 1850: synonym of Conasprella armiger (Crosse, 1858)
 Conus crepusculum Reeve, 1844: synonym of Conus furvus Reeve, 1843
 Conus cretaceus Kiener, 1847: synonym of Conasprella mindana (Hwass in Bruguière, 1792)
 Conus cretheus Nardo, 1847: synonym of Conus ventricosus Gmelin, 1791
 Conus croceus G. B. Sowerby I, 1833: synonym of Conus daucus daucus Hwass in Bruguière, 1792 represented as Conus daucus Hwass in Bruguière, 1792
 Conus croceus E. A. Smith, 1877: synonym of Conasprella hypochlorus (Tomlin, 1937)
 Conus crosseanus Bernardi, 1861: synonym of Conus marmoreus Linnaeus, 1758
 Conus cumingii Reeve, 1849: synonym of Conus virgatus Reeve, 1849
 Conus cuneatus G. B. Sowerby II, 1873: synonym of Conus malacanus Hwass in Bruguière, 1792
 Conus cuneiformis E. A. Smith, 1877: synonym of Conus inscriptus Reeve, 1843
 Conus dactylosus Kiener, 1847: synonym of Conus auricomus Hwass in Bruguière, 1792
 Conus damasoi Cossignani, 2007: synonym of Conasprella damasoi (Cossignani, 2007) 
 Conus damasomonteiroi (Petuch & Myers, 2014): synonym of Conasprella damasomonteiroi (Petuch & Myers, 2014) 
 Conus danieli Crosse, 1858: synonym of Conus algoensis G. B. Sowerby I, 1834
 Conus daullei Crosse, 1858: synonym of Conus consors G. B. Sowerby I, 1833
 Conus dautzenbergi Fenaux, 1942: synonym of Conus imperialis Linnaeus, 1758
 Conus debilis Fenaux, 1943: synonym of Conus auricomus Hwass in Bruguière, 1792
 Conus deburghiae G. B. Sowerby II, 1857: synonym of Conus nocturnus [Lightfoot], 1786
 Conus decrepitus Kiener, 1847: synonym of Conus cocceus Reeve, 1844
 Conus delanoyi Trovão, 1979: synonym of Conus delanoyae Trovão, 1979
 Conus delessertii Récluz, 1843: synonym of Conasprella delessertii (Récluz, 1843) 
 Conus delicatus Schepman, 1913: synonym of Conasprella aculeiformis (Reeve, 1844)
 Conus delucai Coltro, 2004: synonym of Conasprella iansa (Petuch, 1979)
 Conus dentatus Schröter, 1803: synonym of Imbricaria punctata (Swainson, 1821)
 Conus deprehendens Prelle, 2009: synonym of Conus betulinus Linnaeus, 1758
 Conus deshayesii Reeve, 1843: synonym of Conus cuvieri Crosse, 1858
 Conus desmotus Tomlin, 1937: synonym of Conus granarius Kiener, 1847
 Conus dictator Melvill, 1898: synonym of Conasprella dictator (Melvill, 1898) 
 Conus dieteri Moolenbeek, Zandbergen & Bouchet, 2008: synonym of Conasprella dieteri (Moolenbeek, Zandbergen & Bouchet, 2008) 
 Conus dilectus Gould, 1850: synonym of Conus textile Linnaeus, 1758
 Conus dillwynii Reeve, 1849: synonym of Conus erythraeensis Reeve, 1843
 Conus discrepans G. B. Sowerby I, 1833: synonym of Conus catus Hwass in Bruguière, 1792
 Conus dolium Boivin, 1864: synonym of Conus pica A. Adams & Reeve, 1848
 Conus dondani Kosuge, 1981: synonym of Profundiconus dondani (Kosuge, 1981) 
 Conus douvillei Fenaux, 1942: synonym of Conus imperialis Linnaeus, 1758
 Conus drangai Schwengel, 1955: synonym of Conus orion Broderip, 1833
 Conus duplicatus G. B. Sowerby I, 1823: synonym of Conus australis Holten, 1802
 Conus dupontii Kiener, 1846: synonym of Parametaria dupontii (Kiener, 1846)
 Conus duvali Bernardi, 1862: synonym of Conasprella pusio (Hwass in Bruguière, 1792)
 Conus dux Hwass in Bruguière, 1792: synonym of Conus circumcisus Born, 1778
 Conus dux Röding, 1798: synonym of Conus maldivus Hwass in Bruguière, 1792
 Conus echinulatus Kiener, 1848: synonym of Conasprella puncticulata (Hwass in Bruguière, 1792)
 Conus edentulus Reeve, 1844: synonym of Mitra (Dibaphus) edentula Swainson, 1823 represented as Mitra edentula Swainson, 1823
 Conus eduardi Delsaerdt, 1997: synonym of Conus milneedwardsi eduardi Delsaerdt, 1997
 Conus edwardi Preston, 1908: synonym of Conus zonatus Hwass in Bruguière, 1792
 Conus egregius G. B. Sowerby III, 1914: synonym of Conus quercinus [Lightfoot], 1786
 Conus elegans G. B. Sowerby III, 1895: synonym of Conasprella elegans (G. B. Sowerby III, 1895) 
 Conus elegans Schepman, 1913: synonym of Conus comatosa Pilsbry, 1904: synonym of Conasprella comatosa (Pilsbry, 1904)
 Conus elokismenos Kilburn, 1975: synonym of Conasprella elokismenos (Kilburn, 1975) 
 Conus elisae Kiener, 1846: synonym of Conus pennaceus Born, 1778
 Conus elongatus Reeve, 1843: synonym of Conus moreleti Crosse, 1858
 Conus elventinus Duclos, 1833: synonym of Conasprella mindana (Hwass in Bruguière, 1792)
 Conus emarginatus Reeve, 1844: synonym of Conasprella emarginata (Reeve, 1844) 
 Conus emersoni G. D. Hanna, 1963: synonym of Profundiconus emersoni (Hanna, 1963) 
 Conus epaphus Nardo, 1847: synonym of Conus ventricosus Gmelin, 1791
 Conus epaticus Renier, 1804: synonym of Conus ventricosus Gmelin, 1791
 Conus episcopus Hwass in Bruguière, 1792: synonym of Conus pennaceus Born, 1778
 Conus epistomioides Weinkauff, 1875: synonym of Conus magus Linnaeus, 1758
 Conus epistomium Reeve, 1844: synonym of Conus magus Linnaeus, 1758
 Conus eques Hwass in Bruguière, 1792: synonym of Conus ermineus Born, 1778
 Conus ericmonnieri (Petuch & R. F. Myers, 2014): synonym of Conasprella ericmonnieri (Petuch & R. F. Myers, 2014) 
 Conus errosus Renier, 1804: synonym of Conus ventricosus Gmelin, 1791
 Conus erythraeozonatus Barros e Cunha, 1933: synonym of Conus flavidus Lamarck, 1810
 Conus eucoronatus G. B. Sowerby III, 1903: synonym of Conasprella eucoronata (G. B. Sowerby III, 1903)
 Conus euetrios G. B. Sowerby III, 1882: synonym of Conus textile Linnaeus, 1758
 Conus eugrammatus Bartsch & Rehder, 1943: synonym of  Conasprella eugrammata (Bartsch & Rehder, 1943)
 Conus eumitus Tomlin, 1926: synonym of Conus textile Linnaeus, 1758
 Conus euschemon Tomlin, 1937: synonym of Conus timorensis Hwass in Bruguière, 1792
 Conus evelynae G. B. Sowerby III, 1882: synonym of Conus gladiator Broderip, 1833
 Conus exaratus Reeve, 1844: synonym of Conus cinereus Hwass in Bruguière, 1792
 Conus excavatus G. B. Sowerby II, 1866: synonym of Conus fumigatus Hwass in Bruguière, 1792
 Conus exdeshayesi Sacco, 1893: synonym of Conus cuvieri Crosse, 1858
 Conus exquisitus G. B. Sowerby III, 1887: synonym of Conus cardinalis Hwass in Bruguière, 1792
 Conus exumaensis (Petuch, 2013): synonym of Conasprella jaspidea (Gmelin, 1791)
 Conus fabula G. B. Sowerby I, 1833: synonym of Conus coffeae Gmelin, 1791
 Conus fasciatus G. B. Sowerby II, 1858: synonym of Conus ochroleucus Gmelin, 1791
 Conus fasciatus Kiener, 1850: synonym of Conus splendidulus G. B. Sowerby I, 1833
 Conus fasciatus A. Adams, 1855: synonym of Conus attenuatus Reeve, 1844
 Conus fasciatus Perry, 1811: synonym of Conus genuanus Linnaeus, 1758
 Conus felinus Link, 1807: synonym of Conus spectrum Linnaeus, 1758
 Conus fenzani (Petuch & Sargent, 2011): synonym of Conasprella fenzani (Petuch & Sargent, 2011) 
Conus fernandi (Petuch & Berschauer, 2018): synonym of Conus mercator Linnaeus, 1758
 Conus ferrugatus G. B. Sowerby I, 1834: synonym of Conus monilifer Broderip, 1833
 Conus festivus Dillwyn, 1817: synonym of Conus pertusus Hwass in Bruguière, 1792
 Conus fijiensis Moolenbeek, Röckel & Bouchet, 2008: synonym of Conasprella fijiensis (Moolenbeek, Röckel & Bouchet, 2008) 
 Conus filamentosus Reeve, 1849: synonym of Conus spectrum Linnaeus, 1758
 Conus filicinctus Schepman, 1913: synonym of Conus voluminalis Reeve, 1843
 Conus finkli Petuch, 1987: synonym of Conus cancellatus finkli Petuch, 1987
 Conus flammeus Lamarck, 1810: synonym of Conus spurius lorenzianus Dillwyn, 1817
 Conus fletcheri Petuch & Mendenhall, 1972: synonym of Conus pergrandis (Iredale, 1937)
 Conus flindersi Brazier, 1898: synonym of Conus anemone Lamarck, 1810
 Conus floridanus Gabb, 1869: synonym of Conus anabathrum anabathrum Crosse, 1865 represented Conus anabathrum Crosse, 1865
 Conus floridensis G. B. Sowerby II, 1870: synonym of Conus anabathrum Crosse, 1865
 Conus floridus G. B. Sowerby II, 1858: synonym of Conus striatus Linnaeus, 1758
 Conus fluctifer Dillwyn, 1817: synonym of Conus pulcher [Lightfoot], 1786
 Conus fluviamaris Petuch & Sargent, 2011: synonym of Conasprella fluviamaris (Petuch & Sargent, 2011) 
 Conus fortdauphinensis (Bozzetti, 2015): synonym of Conus praelatus Hwass in Bruguière, 1792
 Conus fortis Renier, 1804: synonym of Conus ventricosus Gmelin, 1791
 Conus fosteri Clench, 1942: synonym of Conus villepinii P. Fischer & Bernardi, 1857
 Conus franciscanus Bruguière, 1792: synonym of Conus ventricosus Gmelin, 1791
 Conus frauenfeldi Crosse, 1865: synonym of Conus magus Linnaeus, 1758
 Conus frausseni Tenorio & Poppe, 2004: synonym of Profundiconus frausseni (Tenorio & Poppe, 2004)
 Conus frisbeyae Clench & Pulley, 1952: synonym of Conasprella armiger (Crosse, 1858)
 Conus frostianus Brazier, 1898: synonym of Conus monachus Linnaeus, 1758
 Conus fucatus Reeve, 1849: synonym of Conus magus Linnaeus, 1758
 Conus fulgetrum G. B. Sowerby I, 1834: synonym of Conus miliaris Hwass in Bruguière, 1792
 Conus fulgurans Hwass in Bruguière, 1792: synonym of Conus fulmineus Gmelin, 1791
 Conus fultoni G. B. Sowerby III, 1887: synonym of Conus boeticus Reeve, 1844
 Conus fulvobullatus da Motta, 1982: synonym of Conus magus Linnaeus, 1758
 Conus fulvocinctus Crosse, 1872: synonym of Conus fergusoni G. B. Sowerby II, 1873
 Conus fulvostriatus Fenaux, 1942: synonym of Conus quercinus [Lightfoot], 1786
 Conus fulvus Fenaux, 1943: synonym of Conus flavescens G. B. Sowerby I, 1834
 Conus fulvus G. B. Sowerby III, 1889: synonym of Conus tinianus Hwass in Bruguière, 1792
 Conus fuscatus Born, 1778: synonym of Conus imperialis Linnaeus, 1758
 Conus fuscomaculatus E. A. Smith, 1877: synonym of Conus stramineus Lamarck, 1810
 Conus fusiformis Lamarck, 1810: synonym of Conus compressus G. B. Sowerby II, 1866
 Conus fusiformis Pease, 1861: synonym of Conus parvus Pease, 1868: synonym of Lovellona peaseana Finlay, 1927
 Conus fusiformis Fischer von Waldheim, 1807: synonym of Conus glans Hwass in Bruguière, 1792
 Conus fustigatus Hwass in Bruguière, 1792: synonym of Conus pulicarius Hwass in Bruguière, 1792
 Conus fusus Gmelin, 1791: synonym of Conus terebra Born, 1778 
 Conus gabrielae Rolán & Röckel, 2000: synonym of Conus negroides Kaicher, 1977 
 Conus gabrielii Kiener, 1846: synonym of Conus cinereus Hwass in Bruguière, 1792
 Conus gabryae Röckel & Korn, 1992: synonym of Conus australis Holten, 1802
 Conus gadesi Espinosa & Ortea, 2005: synonym of Conus regius Gmelin, 1791
 Conus galloprovincialis Locard, 1886: synonym of Conus ventricosus Gmelin, 1791
 Conus gambiensis (Petuch & Berschauer, 2018): synonym of Conus guinaicus Hwass in Bruguière, 1792
 Conus gaza Johnson & Pilsbry, 1911 †: synonym of † Conus multiliratus Böse, 1906 
 Conus geeraertsi Poppe & Tagaro, 2017 >
 Conus gemmulatus G. B. Sowerby II, 1870: synonym of Conus acutangulus Lamarck, 1810
 Conus gigas Fischer von Waldheim, 1807: synonym of Conus pulcher [Lightfoot], 1786
 Conus gilberti (Bozzetti, 2012): synonym of Conus balteatus G. B. Sowerby I, 1833
 Conus gilchristi G. B. Sowerby III, 1903: synonym of Conus natalis G. B. Sowerby II, 1858
 Conus glaucescens G. B. Sowerby I, 1834: synonym of Conus ventricosus Gmelin, 1791
 Conus gloria Bosc, 1801: synonym of Conus gloriamaris Chemnitz, 1777
 Conus gloriamaris Perry, 1810: synonym of Conus textile Linnaeus, 1758
 Conus gloynei G. B. Sowerby III, 1881: synonym of Conus gladiator Broderip, 1833
 Conus gordyi Röckel & Bondarev, 2000: synonym of  Conasprella gordyi (Röckel & Bondarev, 2000)
 Conus gracianus da Motta & Blöcher, 1982: synonym of Conus aulicus Linnaeus, 1758
 Conus gracilis G. B. Sowerby I, 1823: synonym of Conus australis Holten, 1802
 Conus gracilis Wood, 1828: synonym of Conus timorensis Hwass in Bruguière, 1792
 Conus gracilis G. B. Sowerby III, 1875: synonym of Conasprella hopwoodi (Tomlin, 1937)
 Conus gradatus Reeve, 1843: synonym of Conus scalarissimus da Motta, 1988
 Conus grandis G. B. Sowerby I, 1823: synonym of Conus pulcher [Lightfoot], 1786
 Conus granifer Reeve, 1849: synonym of Conus furvus Reeve, 1843
 Conus grayi Reeve, 1844: synonym of Conus ermineus Born, 1778
 Conus grenadensis Hwass in Bruguière, 1792: synonym of Conus cedonulli Linnaeus, 1767
 Conus griseus Kiener, 1846: synonym of Conus ambiguus Reeve, 1844
 Conus grohi Tenorio & Poppe, 2004: synonym of Conasprella grohi (Tenorio & Poppe, 2004) 
 Conus grondini Larue, 1995: synonym of Conus moluccensis Küster, 1838
 Conus grossii Maravigna, 1853: synonym of Conus ventricosus Gmelin, 1791
 Conus grueneri Reeve, 1844: synonym of Conus litteratus Linnaeus, 1758
 Conus gubba Kiener, 1848: synonym of Conus cinereus Hwass in Bruguière, 1792
 Conus guestieri Lorois, 1860: synonym of Conus ventricosus Gmelin, 1791
 Conus guiandradoi (Cossignani & Fiadeiro, 2017): synonym of Conus josephinae Rolán, 1980
 Conus guidopoppei Raybaudi Massilia, 2005: synonym of Conasprella guidopoppei (G. Raybaudi Massilia, 2005) 
 Conus guttatus Kiener, 1848: synonym of Conus lineopunctatus Kaicher, 1977
 Conus guyanensis Van Mol, 1973: synonym of Conasprella guyanensis (Van Mol, 1973) 
 Conus halitropus Bartsch & Rehder, 1943: synonym of Conus obscurus G. B. Sowerby I, 1833
 Conus halli da Motta, 1983: synonym of Conus hyaena Hwass in Bruguière, 1792
 Conus hamilli Crosse, 1858: synonym of Conus erythraeensis Reeve, 1843
 Conus hammatus Bartsch & Rehder, 1943: synonym of Conus circumactus Iredale, 1929
 Conus hanleyi G. B. Sowerby II, 1857: synonym of Conus ventricosus Gmelin, 1791
 Conus hawaiensis Kaicher, 1956: synonym of Conus suturatus Reeve, 1844
 Conus hayesi Korn, 2001: synonym of Conus brianhayesi Korn, 2001
 Conus hedgesi G. B. Sowerby III, 1913: synonym of Conus iodostoma Reeve, 1843
 Conus henckesi Coltro, 2004: synonym of Conasprella henckesi (Coltro, 2004) 
 Conus henoquei Bernardi, 1860: synonym of Conus fumigatus Hwass in Bruguière, 1792
 Conus henriquei (Petuch & R. F. Myers, 2014): synonym of Conasprella henriquei (Petuch & R. F. Myers, 2014)
 Conus hepaticus Kiener, 1847: synonym of Conus quercinus [Lightfoot], 1786
 Conus hereditarius da Motta, 1987: synonym of Conus ammiralis Linnaeus, 1758
 Conus herillus Nardo, 1847: synonym of Conus ventricosus Gmelin, 1791
 Conus herndli (Petuch & R. F. Myers, 2014): synonym of Conasprella herndli (Petuch & R. F. Myers, 2014) 
 Conus hevassii A. Adams, 1855: synonym of Conus varius Linnaeus, 1758
 Conus hivanus Moolenbeek, Zandbergen & Bouchet, 2008: synonym of Conasprella hivana (Moolenbeek, Zandbergen & Bouchet, 2008)
 Conus holemani Nowell-Usticke, 1968: synonym of Conus cedonulli Linnaeus, 1767
 Conus hopwoodi Tomlin, 1937: synonym of Conasprella hopwoodi (Tomlin, 1937) 
 Conus howelli Iredale, 1929: synonym of  Conasprella howelli (Iredale, 1929) 
 Conus huberi Thach, 2018: synonym of Conus striatus Linnaeus, 1758
 Conus huberorum da Motta, 1989: synonym of Conus buxeus loroisii Kiener, 1846
 Conus humilis von Salis Marschlins, 1793: synonym of Conus ventricosus Gmelin, 1791
 Conus hunti Wils & Moolenbeek, 1979: synonym of Conus sanderi Wils & Moolenbeek, 1979
 Conus hybridus Kiener, 1845: synonym of Conus franciscanus Hwass in Bruguière, 1792
 Conus hypochlorus Tomlin, 1937: synonym of Conasprella hypochlorus (Tomlin, 1937)
 Conus iansa Petuch, 1979: synonym of  Conasprella iansa (Petuch, 1979)
 Conus iberogermanicus Röckel, Rolán & Monteiro, 1980: synonym of Conus irregularis G. B. Sowerby II, 1858
 Conus ichinoseanus (Kuroda, 1956): synonym of  Conasprella ichinoseana (Kuroda, 1956) 
 Conus ignobilis Olivi, 1792: synonym of Conus ventricosus Gmelin, 1791
 Conus iheringi Frenguelli, 1946: synonym of Conus carcellesi Martins, 1945 
 Conus ikedai Ninomiya, 1987: synonym of Profundiconus ikedai (Ninomiya, 1987) 
 Conus imperator Woolacott, 1956: synonym of Conus biliosus parvulus Link, 1807
 Conus inaequalis Reeve, 1849: synonym of Conus ventricosus Gmelin, 1791
 Conus incarnatus Reeve, 1844: synonym of Conus hyaena Hwass in Bruguière, 1792
 Conus incinctus Fenaux, 1942: synonym of Conus anemone Lamarck, 1810
 Conus incurvus G. B. Sowerby I, 1833: synonym of Conus regularis G. B. Sowerby I, 1833
 Conus induratus Reeve, 1849: synonym of Conus erythraeensis Reeve, 1843
 Conus inermis Tinker, 1952: synonym of Conus litoglyphus Hwass in Bruguière, 1792
 Conus informis Hwass in Bruguière, 1792: synonym of Conus mozambicus Hwass in Bruguière, 1792
 Conus innexus A. Adams, 1855: synonym of Conus consors G. B. Sowerby I, 1833
 Conus innotabilis E. A. Smith, 1892: synonym of Conus cyanostoma A. Adams, 1855
 Conus inquinatus Reeve, 1849: synonym of Conus ermineus Born, 1778
 Conus insculptus Kiener, 1845: synonym of  Conasprella insculpta (Kiener, 1847) 
 Conus insignis G. B. Sowerby I, 1833: synonym of Conus locumtenens Blumenbach, 1791
 Conus insularis Gmelin, 1791: synonym of Conus cedonulli Linnaeus, 1767
 Conus intermedius Lamarck, 1810: synonym of Conus ventricosus Gmelin, 1791
 Conus intermedius Reeve, 1843: synonym of Conus eldredi Morrison, 1955
 Conus interruptus Wood, 1828: synonym of Conus brunneus Wood, 1828
 Conus interruptus Broderip & G. B. Sowerby I, 1829: synonym of Conasprella ximenes (Gray, 1839)
 Conus ione Fulton, 1938: synonym of Conasprella ione (Fulton, 1938) 
 Conus istriensis Nardo, 1847: synonym of Conus ventricosus Gmelin, 1791
 Conus jacquescolombi (Monnier & Limpalaër, 2016): synonym of Conus riosi Petuch, 1986
 Conus jamaicensis Hwass in Bruguière, 1792: synonym of Conus ventricosus Gmelin, 1791
 Conus janowskyae (Tucker & Tenorio, 2011): synonym of Conasprella janowskyae (Tucker & Tenorio, 2011) 
 Conus japonicus Hwass in Bruguière, 1792: synonym of Conasprella spirofilis (Habe & Kosuge, 1970)
 Conus jaspideus Gmelin, 1791: synonym of Conasprella jaspidea (Gmelin, 1791)
 Conus jeanmartini G. Raybaudi Massilia, 1992: synonym of Profundiconus jeanmartini G. Raybaudi Massilia, 1992 
 Conus jeffreyi (Petuch & Sargent, 2011): synonym of Conus quercinus [Lightfoot], 1786
 Conus joliveti Moolenbeek, Röckel & Bouchet, 2008: synonym of Conasprella joliveti (Moolenbeek, Röckel & Bouchet, 2008) 
 Conus josegeraldoi (Cossignani & Fiadeiro, 2018): synonym of Conus crotchii Reeve, 1849
 Conus joserochoi (Cossignani, 2014): synonym of Conus delanoyae Trovão, 1979
 Conus jousseaumei Couturier, 1891: synonym of Conus thomae Gmelin, 1791
 Conus jukesii Reeve, 1848: synonym of Conus papilliferus G. B. Sowerby I, 1834
 Conus juliae Clench, 1942: synonym of Conus amphiurgus Dall, 1889
 Conus kanakinus Richard, 1983: synonym of Profundiconus kanakinus (Richard, 1983) 
 Conus kantanganus da Motta, 1982: synonym of Conasprella longurionis (Kiener, 1847)
 Conus karinae Nowell-Usticke, 1968: synonym of Conasprella mindana (Hwass in Bruguière, 1792)
 Conus keatiformis Shikama, 1977: synonym of Conus inscriptus Reeve, 1843
 Conus keatii G. B. Sowerby II, 1858: synonym of Conus inscriptus Reeve, 1843
 Conus kenyonae Brazier, 1896: synonym of Conus distans Hwass in Bruguière, 1792
 Conus kieneri Crosse, 1858: synonym of Conus cocceus Reeve, 1844
 Conus kimioi (Habe, 1965): synonym of Conasprella kimioi (Habe, 1965)
 Conus kintoki Coomans & Moolenbeek, 1982: synonym of Conus kintoki Habe & Kosuge, 1970
 Conus kitteredgei Maury, 1917 †: synonym of Conasprella kitteredgei (Maury, 1917) †
 Conus knudseni Sander, 1982: synonym of Conus sanderi Wils & Moolenbeek, 1979
 Conus kobelti Löbbecke, 1882: synonym of Conus hyaena Hwass in Bruguière, 1792
 Conus kohni McLean & Nybakken, 1979: synonym of Conasprella kohni (McLean & Nybakken, 1979) 
 Conus kongaensis da Motta, 1984: synonym of Conus wittigi Walls, 1977
 Conus korni G. Raybaudi Massilia, 1993: synonym of Pseudolilliconus korni (G. Raybaudi Massilia, 1993)
 Conus krabiensis da Motta, 1982: synonym of Conus generalis Linnaeus, 1767
 Conus kraussi Turton, 1932: synonym of Conus tinianus Hwass in Bruguière, 1792
 Conus kuiperi Moolenbeek, 2006: synonym of Pseudolilliconus kuiperi (Moolenbeek, 2006)
 Conus kurzi Petuch, 1974: synonym of Conus sazanka Shikama, 1970
 Conus lachrymosus Reeve, 1849: synonym of Conus boeticus Reeve, 1844
 Conus lacinulatus Kiener, 1850: synonym of Conus litoglyphus Hwass in Bruguière, 1792
 Conus lacteus Lamarck, 1810: synonym of Conus purissimus Filmer, 2011
 Conus laetus Gmelin, 1791: synonym of Conus granulatus Linnaeus, 1758
 Conus laevigatus G. B. Sowerby II, 1858: synonym of Conus namocanus Hwass in Bruguière, 1792
 Conus laevis Gmelin, 1791: synonym of Conus circumactus Iredale, 1929
 Conus lamarckii Kiener, 1847: synonym of Conus mercator Linnaeus, 1758
 Conus lani Crandall, 1979: synonym of Profundiconus lani (Crandall, 1979) 
 Conus lapideus Holten, 1802: synonym of Conus zonatus Hwass in Bruguière, 1792
 Conus lapulapui da Motta & Martin, 1982: synonym of Conasprella eugrammata (Bartsch & Rehder, 1943)
 Conus latifasciatus G. B. Sowerby II, 1858: synonym of Conus janus Hwass in Bruguière, 1792
 Conus lautus Reeve, 1844: synonym of Conus mozambicus Hwass in Bruguière, 1792
 Conus lavendulus Bartsch, 1915: synonym of Conus tinianus Hwass in Bruguière, 1792
 Conus leaeneus Link, 1807: synonym of Conus ermineus Born, 1778
 Conus leehmani da Motta & Röckel, 1979: synonym of Conus gubernator Hwass in Bruguière, 1792
 Conus lemuriensis Wils & Delsaerdt, 1989: synonym of Conus milneedwardsi lemuriensis Wils & Delsaerdt, 1989
 Conus lenhilli Cargile, 1998: synonym of Conasprella lenhilli (Cargile, 1998) 
 Conus lentiginosus Reeve, 1844: synonym of  Conasprella lentiginosa (Reeve, 1844) 
 Conus leoninus Hwass in Bruguière, 1792: synonym of Conus spurius Gmelin, 1791
 Conus leoninus [Lightfoot], 1786: synonym of Conus striatus Linnaeus, 1758
 Conus leoninus Gmelin, 1791: synonym of Conus pulcher [Lightfoot], 1786
 Conus leopardus Dillwyn, 1817: synonym of Conus vexillum Gmelin, 1791
 Conus leucostictus Gmelin, 1791: synonym of Conus regius Gmelin, 1791
 Conus lictor Boivin, 1864: synonym of Conus striatellus Link, 1807
 Conus lignarius Reeve, 1843: synonym of Conus furvus Reeve, 1843
 Conus lineatus Hwass in Bruguière, 1792: synonym of Conus striatellus Link, 1807
 Conus lineolatus Valenciennes, 1832: synonym of Conus princeps Linnaeus, 1758
 Conus liratus Reeve, 1844: synonym of Conus sphacelatus G. B. Sowerby I, 1833
 Conus listeri Renier, 1804: synonym of Conus ventricosus Gmelin, 1791
 Conus lizarum (G. Raybaudi Massilia & da Motta, 1992): synonym of Conasprella lizarum (Raybaudi Massilia & da Motta, 1992)
 Conus loebbeckeanus Weinkauff, 1873: synonym of Conus ferrugineus Hwass in Bruguière, 1792
 Conus lombei G. B. Sowerby III, 1881: synonym of Conasprella articulata (G. B. Sowerby II, 1873)
 Conus longurionis Kiener, 1845: synonym of  Conasprella longurionis (Kiener, 1847) 
 Conus lorenzi (Monnier & Limpalaër, 2012): synonym of Conasprella lorenzi Monnier & Limpalaër, 2012
 Conus loroisii Kiener, 1846: synonym of Conus buxeus loroisii Kiener, 1846
 Conus lovellreevei G. Raybaudi Massilia, 1993: synonym of Conus asiaticus lovellreevei G. Raybaudi Massilia, 1993
 Conus loveni Krauss, 1848: synonym of Conus tinianus Hwass in Bruguière, 1792
 Conus loyaltiensis Röckel, Richard, & Moolenbeek, 1995: synonym of Profundiconus loyaltiensis (Röckel & Moolenbeek, 1995) 
 Conus lubeckianus Bernardi, 1861: synonym of Conus cardinalis Hwass in Bruguière, 1792
 Conus lucasi (Bozzetti, 2010): synonym of Conus chiapponorum Lorenz, 2004
 Conus lucidus Wood, 1828: synonym of Conasprella lucida (W. Wood, 1828) 
 Conus lucirensis Paes Da Franca, 1957: synonym of Conus chytreus Tryon, 1884
 Conus luctificus Reeve, 1848: synonym of Conus fumigatus Hwass in Bruguière, 1792
 Conus luridus A. Adams, 1855: synonym of Conus taslei Kiener, 1850
 Conus luziensis Rolán, Röckel & Monteiro, 1983: synonym of Conus grahami luziensis Rolán, Röckel & Monteiro, 1983
 Conus luzonicus sensu G. B. Sowerby II, 1858: synonym of Conus purpurascens G. B. Sowerby I, 1833
 Conus luzonicus Hwass in Bruguière, 1792: synonym of Conus ermineus Born, 1778
 Conus macarae Bernardi, 1857: synonym of Conus voluminalis Reeve, 1843
 Conus macei Crosse, 1865: synonym of Conus mozambicus Hwass in Bruguière, 1792
 Conus mackintoshi (Petuch, 2013): synonym of Conasprella mindana (Hwass in Bruguière, 1792)
 Conus macleayana Tenison-Woods, 1877: synonym of Conasprella rutila (Menke, 1843)
 Conus maculatus G. B. Sowerby II, 1858: synonym of Conus anemone Lamarck, 1810
 Conus maculatus Perry, 1811: synonym of Conus marmoreus Linnaeus, 1758
 Conus maculatus Bosc, 1801: synonym of Conus sponsalis Hwass in Bruguière, 1792
 Conus maculospira Pilsbry, 1922: synonym of Conus inscriptus Reeve, 1843
 Conus maculosus G. B. Sowerby I, 1833: synonym of Conus anemone Lamarck, 1810
 Conus madurensis Hwass in Bruguière, 1792: synonym of Conus ventricosus Gmelin, 1791
 Conus magdalenae Kiener, 1847: synonym of Conus floccatus G. B. Sowerby I, 1841
 Conus magdalenensis Bartsch & Rehder, 1939: synonym of Conus regularis G. B. Sowerby I, 1833
 Conus mahogani] Reeve, 1843: synonym of Conasprella mahogani (Reeve, 1843) 
Conus maltzanianus Weinkauff, 1873: synonym of Conus frigidus Reeve, 1848
 Conus mamillaris Green, 1830: synonym of Conus daucus daucus Hwass in Bruguière, 1792 represented as Conus daucus Hwass in Bruguière, 1792
 Conus mappa Hwass in Bruguière, 1792: synonym of Conus mappa [Lightfoot], 1786
 Conus mappa Crosse, 1858: synonym of Conus eldredi Morrison, 1955
 Conus mariei Jousseaume, 1899: synonym of Conus thalassiarchus G. B. Sowerby I, 1834
 Conus marinae (Petuch & Myers, 2014): synonym of Conasprella marinae (Petuch & Myers, 2014) 
 Conus marmoreus Perry, 1811: synonym of Conus monile Hwass in Bruguière, 1792
 Conus martinicanus Hwass in Bruguière, 1792: synonym of Conus cedonulli Linnaeus, 1767
 Conus masoni G. Nevill & H. Nevill, 1874: synonym of Conus caracteristicus Fischer von Waldheim, 1807
 Conus massemini (Monnier & Limpalaër, 2016): synonym of Conus daucus Hwass in Bruguière, 1792
 Conus mauricioi Coltro, 2004: synonym of Conus ziczac archetypus Crosse, 1865
 Conus mauritianus Hwass in Bruguière, 1792: synonym of Conasprella puncticulata (Hwass in Bruguière, 1792)
 Conus mayaguensis Nowell-Usticke, 1968: synonym of Conus cardinalis Hwass in Bruguière, 1792 
 Conus mazei Deshayes, 1874: synonym of Conasprella mazei (Deshayes, 1874) 
 Conus mcgintyi Pilsbry, 1955: synonym of Conasprella mcgintyi (Pilsbry, 1955) 
 Conus mediterraneus Hwass in Bruguière, 1792: synonym of Conus ventricosus Gmelin, 1791
 Conus melancholicus Lamarck, 1810: synonym of Conus magus Linnaeus, 1758
 Conus meleus G. B. Sowerby III, 1913: synonym of Conus boeticus Reeve, 1844
 Conus melinus Shikama, 1964: synonym of Conus mustelinus Hwass in Bruguière, 1792
 Conus memiae (Habe & Kosuge, 1970): synonym of  Conasprella memiae (Habe & Kosuge, 1970)
 Conus merleti Mayissian, 1974: synonym of Conus moluccensis Küster, 1838 
 Conus metcalfei Angas, 1877: synonym of Conus angasi Tryon, 1884
 Conus metcalfii Reeve, 1843: synonym of Conus magus Linnaeus, 1758
 Conus micarius Hedley, 1912: synonym of Mitromorpha micaria (Hedley, 1912)
 Conus mighelsi Kiener, 1847: synonym of Conus musicus Hwass in Bruguière, 1792
 Conus millepunctatus Lamarck, 1822: synonym of Conus leopardus (Röding, 1798)
 Conus mindanus Hwass in Bruguière, 1792: synonym of Conasprella mindana (Hwass in Bruguière, 1792) 
 Conus minimus Linnaeus, 1758 (unaccepted, Nomenclaturally invalid name, placed on the Official Index of Invalid and Rejected Specific Names in Zoology (ICZN Opinion n°753))
 Conus minimus (Cossignani & Fiadeiro, 2015): synonym of Conus longilineus Röckel, Rolán & Monteiro, 1980
 Conus minutus Schröter, 1803: synonym of Conus jickelii Weinkauff, 1873
 Conus minutus Reeve, 1844: synonym of Conasprella pusio (Hwass in Bruguière, 1792)
 Conus mirmillo Crosse, 1865: synonym of Conus ferrugineus Hwass in Bruguière, 1792
 Conus miser Boivin, 1864: synonym of Conus ambiguus Reeve, 1844
 Conus mitraeformis Wood, 1828: synonym of Conus mitratus Hwass in Bruguière, 1792 
 Conus modestus G. B. Sowerby I, 1833: synonym of Conus fulmen Reeve, 1843
 Conus molaerivus Dekkers, 2016: synonym of Pygmaeconus molaerivus (Dekkers, 2016) 
 Conus monstrosus Küster, 1838: synonym of Conus araneosus [Lightfoot], 1786
 Conus morroensis (Cossignani & Fiadeiro, 2014): synonym of Conus diminutus Trovão & Rolán, 1986
 Conus moussoni Crosse, 1865: synonym of Conus balteatus G. B. Sowerby I, 1833
 Conus moylani Delsaerdt, 2000: synonym of Conus papuensis Coomans & Moolenbeek, 1982
 Conus multibandatus Bozzetti, 2017: synonym of Conus coronatus Gmelin, 1791 
 Conus multicatenatus G. B. Sowerby II, 1865: synonym of Conus locumtenens Blumenbach, 1791
 Conus multilineatus G. B. Sowerby III, 1875: synonym of Conus furvus Reeve, 1843
 Conus muscosus Lamarck, 1810: synonym of Conus caracteristicus Fischer von Waldheim, 1807
 Conus musivum G. B. Sowerby I, 1833: synonym of Conus legatus Lamarck, 1810
 Conus musivus Trovão, 1975: synonym of Conus alexandrinus Kaicher, 1977
 Conus mutabilis Reeve, 1844: synonym of Conus hyaena Hwass in Bruguière, 1792
 Conus nahoniaraensis da Motta, 1986: synonym of Conus zebra Lamarck, 1810
 Conus narcissus Lamarck, 1810: synonym of Conus ermineus Born, 1778
 Conus nasui Ninomiya, 1974: synonym of Conasprella eugrammata (Bartsch & Rehder, 1943)
 Conus nebulosus Gmelin, 1791: synonym of Conus monachus Linnaeus, 1758
 Conus nebulosus Hwass in Bruguière, 1792: synonym of Conus regius Gmelin, 1791
 Conus neglectus A. Adams, 1855: synonym of Conus aplustre Reeve, 1843
 Conus neglectus Pease, 1861: synonym of Conus flavidus Lamarck, 1810
 Conus nelsonandradoi (Cossignani & Fiadeiro, 2015): synonym of Conus longilineus Röckel, Rolán & Monteiro, 1980
 Conus neoafricanus da Motta, 1991: synonym of Conus africanus Kiener, 1848
 Conus neobuxeus da Motta, 1991: synonym of Conus furvus Reeve, 1843
 Conus neoguttatus da Motta, 1991: synonym of Conus lineopunctatus Kaicher, 1977 
 Conus neotorquatus da Motta, 1985: synonym of Profundiconus teramachii (Kuroda, 1956)
 Conus neptunoides E. A. Smith, 1880: synonym of Conus neptunus Reeve, 1843
 Conus nereis Petuch, 1979: synonym of Conasprella wakayamaensis (Kuroda, 1956)
 Conus nicobaricus Hwass in Bruguière, 1792: synonym of Conus araneosus nicobaricus Hwass in Bruguière, 1792
 Conus nicolii J. Wilson, 1831: synonym of Conus pulcher [Lightfoot], 1786
 Conus nigrescens G. B. Sowerby II, 1860: synonym of Conus bandanus Hwass in Bruguière, 1792
 Conus nigrostriatus Kosuge, 1979: synonym of Profundiconus lani (Crandall, 1979)
 Conus nipponicus da Motta, 1985: synonym of Conasprella spirofilis (Habe & Kosuge, 1970)
 Conus nisus Kiener, 1846: synonym of Conus amplus Röckel & Korn, 1992
 Conus nisus Dillwyn, 1817: synonym of Conus cinereus Hwass in Bruguière, 1792
 Conus nitidissimus Fenaux, 1942: synonym of Conus anemone Lamarck, 1810
 Conus nitidus Reeve, 1844: synonym of Conus boeticus Reeve, 1844
 Conus nivalis da Motta, 1985: synonym of Conus furvus Reeve, 1843
 Conus nivifer G. B. Sowerby I, 1833: synonym of Conus venulatus Hwass in Bruguière, 1792
 Conus nivosus Lamarck, 1810: synonym of Conus venulatus Hwass in Bruguière, 1792
 Conus nocturnus Hwass in Bruguière, 1792: synonym of Conus nocturnus [Lightfoot], 1786
 Conus nodiferus Kiener, 1847: synonym of Conasprella jaspidea pealii (Green, 1830)
 Conus norai da Motta & G. Raybaudi Massilia, 1992: synonym of Conus daucus Hwass in Bruguière, 1792
 Conus novaehollandiae A. Adams, 1855: synonym of Conus anemone novaehollandiae A. Adams, 1855
 Conus novemstriatus (Röding, 1798): synonym of Conus fulmineus Gmelin, 1791 (nomen dubium)
 Conus nubecula Gmelin, 1791: synonym of Conus bullatus Linnaeus, 1758
 Conus nullisecundus Nowell-Usticke, 1968: synonym of Conus cedonulli Linnaeus, 1767
 Conus obesus Hwass in Bruguière, 1792: synonym of Conus zeylanicus Gmelin, 1791
 Conus oblitus Reeve, 1849: synonym of Conus moreleti Crosse, 1858
 Conus obtusus Kiener, 1850: synonym of Conus variegatus Kiener, 1848
 Conus ochraceus Lamarck, 1810: synonym of Conus spurius Gmelin, 1791
 Conus oculatus Gmelin, 1791: synonym of Conus ermineus Born, 1778
 Conus ogum (Petuch & R. F. Myers, 2014): synonym of Conasprella ogum (Petuch & R. F. Myers, 2014)
 Conus okamotoi Kuroda & Itô, 1961: synonym of Conus lischkeanus Weinkauff, 1875
 Conus olangoensis Poppe & Tagaro, 2017: synonym of Conasprella olangoensis (Poppe & Tagaro, 2017)
 Conus oleiniki (Petuch, 2013): synonym of Conasprella jaspidea (Gmelin, 1791)
 Conus olgae Bacallado, Espinosa & Ortea, 2007: synonym of Conus havanensis Aguayo & Pérez Farfante, 1947 
 Conus olgiatii Bozzetti, 2007: synonym of Conus balteatus G. B. Sowerby I, 1833
 Conus olivaceus Salis Marschlins, 1793: synonym of Conus ventricosus Gmelin, 1791
 Conus olivaceus Kiener, 1850: synonym of Conus ventricosus Gmelin, 1791
 Conus oltmansianus van Lennep, 1876: synonym of Conus gradatulus Weinkauff, 1875
 Conus omaicus Hwass in Bruguière, 1792: synonym of Conus thomae Gmelin, 1791
 Conus omanensis Moolenbeek & Coomans, 1993: synonym of Conus biraghii omanensis Moolenbeek & Coomans, 1993: synonym of Conasprella biraghii omanensis (Moolenbeek & Coomans, 1993)
 Conus optimus G. B. Sowerby III, 1913: synonym of Conus exiguus Lamarck, 1810
 Conus orbignyi Audouin, 1831: synonym of Conasprella orbignyi (Audouin, 1831) 
 Conus orbitatus Reeve, 1843: synonym of Conus sulcatus Hwass in Bruguière, 1792
 Conus ornatus G. B. Sowerby I, 1833: synonym of Conus magellanicus Hwass in Bruguière, 1792
 Conus orri Ninomiya & da Motta, 1982: synonym of Conus mercator Linnaeus, 1758
 Conus otohimeae Kuroda & Itô, 1961: synonym of  Conasprella otohimeae (Kuroda & Itô, 1961)
 Conus pacei Petuch, 1987: synonym of Conasprella pacei (Petuch, 1987) 
 Conus pacificus Moolenbeek & Röckel, 1996: synonym of Profundiconus pacificus (Moolenbeek & Röckel, 1996) 
 Conus padarosae (Cossignani & Fiadeiro, 2018): synonym of Conus antoniaensis (Cossignani & Fiadeiro, 2014)
 Conus pagodus Kiener, 1845: synonym of Conasprella pagoda (Kiener, 1845)
 Conus pallans Nardo, 1847: synonym of Conus ventricosus Gmelin, 1791
 Conus panniculus Lamarck, 1810: synonym of Conus textile Linnaeus, 1758
 Conus papalis Weinkauff, 1875: synonym of Mitromorpha papalis (Weinkauff, 1875)
 Conus papilionaceus Hwass in Bruguière, 1792: synonym of Conus pulcher [Lightfoot], 1786
 Conus papillaris A. Adams & Reeve, 1848: synonym of Conus gradatulus Weinkauff, 1875
 Conus papillaris Reeve, 1849: synonym of Conus gradatulus Weinkauff, 1875
 Conus papillaris G. B. Sowerby I, 1833: synonym of Conus pulcher [Lightfoot], 1786
 Conus papillosus Kiener, 1847: synonym of Conasprella puncticulata (Hwass in Bruguière, 1792)
 Conus paradiseus Shikama, 1977: synonym of Conus barthelemyi Bernardi, 1861
 Conus pardus Link, 1807: synonym of Conus leopardus (Röding, 1798)
 Conus particolor Perry, 1810: synonym of Conus aulicus Linnaeus, 1758
 Conus parvus Pease, 1868: synonym of Lovellona peaseana Finlay, 1927
 Conus parvus Gebauer, 1802: synonym of Conus coronatus Gmelin, 1791
 Conus pastinaca Lamarck, 1810: synonym of Conus daucus daucus Hwass in Bruguière, 1792 represented as Conus daucus Hwass in Bruguière, 1792
 Conus patamakanthini Delsaerdt, 1998: synonym of Conus australis Holten, 1802
 Conus patens G. B. Sowerby III, 1903: synonym of Conus gradatulus Weinkauff, 1875
 Conus patonganus da Motta, 1982: synonym of Conus omaria Hwass in Bruguière, 1792
 Conus paulina Kiener, 1850: synonym of Conus spurius Gmelin, 1791
 Conus paulucciae G. B. Sowerby III, 1887: synonym of Conus aureus paulucciae G. B. Sowerby III, 1887
 Conus pazii Bernardi, 1857: synonym of Conus fumigatus Hwass in Bruguière, 1792
 Conus pealii (Green, 1840): synonym of Conasprella jaspidea pealii (Green, 1830) 
 Conus pedrofiadeiroi (Cossignani & Fiadeiro, 2015): synonym of Conus borgesi Trovão, 1979
 Conus pennasilicorum Bozzetti, 2017: synonym of Conus alconnelli da Motta, 1986
 Conus pepeiu Moolenbeek, Zandbergen & Bouchet, 2008: synonym of Conasprella pepeiu (Moolenbeek, Zandbergen & Bouchet, 2008) 
 Conus peplum G. B. Sowerby II, 1857: synonym of Conus araneosus [Lightfoot], 1786
 Conus perplexus G. B. Sowerby II, 1857: synonym of Conasprella perplexa (G. B. Sowerby II, 1857) 
 Conus perprotractus Petuch, 1987: synonym of Conus sanderi Wils & Moolenbeek, 1979
 Conus perryae Clench, 1942: synonym of Conus ermineus Born, 1778
 Conus petricosus Azuma, 1961: synonym of Conasprella sieboldii (Reeve, 1848)
 Conus pfluegeri Petuch, 2003: synonym of Conasprella pfluegeri (Petuch, 2003) 
 Conus phegeus Nardo, 1847: synonym of Conus ventricosus Gmelin, 1791
 Conus phlogopus Tomlin, 1937: synonym of Conus spurius lorenzianus Dillwyn, 1817
 Conus phuketensis da Motta, 1978: synonym of Conus pretiosus G. Nevill & H. Nevill, 1874
 Conus pigmentatus A. Adams & Reeve, 1848: synonym of Conus balteatus G. B. Sowerby I, 1833
 Conus pilkeyi Petuch, 1974: synonym of Conus ochroleucus tmetus Tomlin, 1937
 Conus pineaui Pin & Leung Tack, 1995: synonym of Conus guinaicus Hwass in Bruguière, 1792
 Conus pinedensis (Cossignani & Fiadeiro, 2017): synonym of Conus damottai Trovão, 1979
 Conus piperatus Reeve, 1844: synonym of Conus erythraeensis Reeve, 1843
 Conus piperatus Dillwyn, 1817: synonym of Conus biliosus (Röding, 1798)
 Conus planaxis Deshayes, 1863: synonym of Conus maldivus Hwass in Bruguière, 1792
 Conus planicostatus G. B. Sowerby I, 1833: synonym of Conasprella orbignyi (Audouin, 1831)
 Conus planiliratus G. B. Sowerby III, 1870: synonym of Conus inscriptus Reeve, 1843
 Conus plebejus Link, 1807: synonym of Conus lividus Hwass in Bruguière, 1792
 Conus plumbeus Reeve, 1844: synonym of Conus exiguus Lamarck, 1810
 Conus poehlianus G. B. Sowerby III, 1887: synonym of Conus consors G. B. Sowerby I, 1833
 Conus politus Weinkauff, 1875: synonym of Conus cinereus Hwass in Bruguière, 1792
 Conus polyglotta Weinkauff, 1874: synonym of Conus eburneus Hwass in Bruguière, 1792
 Conus polygrammus Tomlin, 1937: synonym of Conus furvus Reeve, 1843
 Conus polyzonias Gmelin, 1791: synonym of Conus planorbis Born, 1778
 Conus pomponeti (Petuch & Myers, 2014): synonym of Conasprella pomponeti (Petuch & Myers, 2014) 
 Conus pontificalis Lamarck, 1810: synonym of Conus dorreensis Péron, 1807
 Conus poppei Elsen, 1983: synonym of Conus crotchii Reeve, 1849
 Conus poremskii (Petuch & R. F. Myers, 2014): synonym of Conasprella poremskii (Petuch & R. F. Myers, 2014)
 Conus portoricanus Hwass in Bruguière, 1792: synonym of Conus ermineus Born, 1778
 Conus postdiluvianus Risso, 1826: synonym of Conus ventricosus Gmelin, 1791
 Conus potusmarumai Kosuge, 1980: synonym of Conus pergrandis (Iredale, 1937)
 Conus praeclarus Fenaux, 1942: synonym of Conus planorbis Born, 1778
 Conus praefectus Hwass in Bruguière, 1792: synonym of Conus ochroleucus Gmelin, 1791
 Conus praelatus Hwass in Bruguière, 1792: synonym of Conus pennaceus Born, 1778
 Conus praetextus Reeve, 1848: synonym of Conus encaustus Kiener, 1845
 Conus prevosti G. B. Sowerby III, 1881: synonym of Conus lienardi Bernardi & Crosse, 1861
 Conus primula Reeve, 1849: synonym of Conus lividus Hwass in Bruguière, 1792
 Conus priscai (Bozzetti, 2012): synonym of Conus archiepiscopus Hwass in Bruguière, 1792
 Conus profundorum (Kuroda, 1956): synonym of Profundiconus profundorum (Kuroda, 1956) 
 Conus prometheus Hwass in Bruguière, 1792: synonym of Conus pulcher [Lightfoot], 1786
 Conus propinquus E. A. Smith, 1877: synonym of Conus balteatus G. B. Sowerby I, 1833
 Conus proteus Hwass in Bruguière, 1792: synonym of Conus spurius Gmelin, 1791
 Conus prytanis G. B. Sowerby III, 1882: synonym of Conus diadema G. B. Sowerby I, 1834
 Conus pseudoaustini Nowell-Usticke, 1968: synonym of Conasprella bajanensis (Nowell-Usticke, 1968)
 Conus pseudocoelinae Delsaerdt, 1989: synonym of Conus coelinae Crosse, 1858
 Conus pseudojaspideus Nowell-Usticke, 1968: synonym of Conasprella jaspidea pealii (Green, 1830)
 Conus pseudokimioi da Motta & Martin, 1982: synonym of  Conasprella pseudokimioi (da Motta & Martin, 1982)
 Conus pseudomarmoreus Crosse, 1875: synonym of Conus marmoreus Linnaeus, 1758
 Conus pseudorbignyi Röckel & Lan, 1981: synonym of  Conasprella pseudorbignyi (Röckel & Lan, 1981)
 Conus pulchellus Swainson, 1822: synonym of Conus circumactus Iredale, 1929
 Conus pulchellus G. B. Sowerby I, 1834: synonym of Conus varius Linnaeus, 1758
 Conus pulcher A. Adams, 1855: synonym of Conus proximus G. B. Sowerby II, 1860
 Conus pulcherrimus Brazier, 1894: synonym of Conus excelsus G. B. Sowerby III, 1908
 Conus pulchrelineatus Hopwood, 1921: synonym of Conus striatellus Link, 1807
 Conus punctatus Gmelin, 1791: synonym of Conus augur [Lightfoot], 1786
 Conus punctatus Hwass in Bruguière, 1792: synonym of Conus biliosus (Röding, 1798)
 Conus puncticulatus Hwass in Bruguière, 1792: synonym of Conasprella puncticulata (Hwass in Bruguière, 1792)
 Conus puncturatus Hwass in Bruguière, 1792: synonym of Conus sponsalis Hwass in Bruguière, 1792
 Conus purus Pease, 1863: synonym of Conus pennaceus Born, 1778
 Conus pusillus Reeve, 1843: synonym of Conus parvatus Walls, 1979
 Conus pusillus Gould, 1853: synonym of Conus nux Broderip, 1833
 Conus pusillus G. B. Sowerby II, 1857: synonym of Conus parvatus Walls, 1979
 Conus pusillus Lamarck, 1810: synonym of Conasprella pusio (Hwass in Bruguière, 1792)
 Conus pusio G. B. Sowerby I, 1834: synonym of Conus melvilli G. B. Sowerby III, 1879
 Conus pusio Hwass in Bruguière, 1792: synonym of Conasprella pusio (Hwass in Bruguière, 1792) 
 Conus pygmaeus Reeve, 1844: synonym of Conasprella puncticulata (Hwass in Bruguière, 1792)
 Conus pyramidalis Lamarck, 1810: synonym of Conus canonicus Hwass in Bruguière, 1792
 Conus pyriformis Reeve, 1843: synonym of Conus patricius Hinds, 1843
 Conus quadratomaculatus G. B. Sowerby II, 1866: synonym of Conus erythraeensis Reeve, 1843
 Conus quadratus Perry, 1811: synonym of Conus ebraeus Linnaeus, 1758
 Conus quaestor Lamarck, 1810: synonym of Conus venulatus Hwass in Bruguière, 1792
 Conus quasimagnificus da Motta, 1982: synonym of Conus pennaceus Born, 1778
 Conus queketti E. A. Smith, 1906: synonym of Conus imperialis queketti E. A. Smith, 1906
 Conus quercinus Hwass in Bruguière, 1792: synonym of Conus quercinus [Lightfoot], 1786
 Conus racemosus G. B. Sowerby II, 1874: synonym of Conus pennaceus Born, 1778
 Conus rachelae Petuch, 1988: synonym of Conasprella rachelae (Petuch, 1988) 
 Conus rainesae McGinty, 1953: synonym of  Conasprella rainesae (McGinty, 1953) 
 Conus ranunculus Hwass in Bruguière, 1792: synonym of Conus achatinus Gmelin, 1791
 Conus raoulensis Powell, 1958: synonym of Conasprella raoulensis (Powell, 1958) 
 Conus raphanus Hwass in Bruguière, 1792: synonym of Conus magus Linnaeus, 1758
 Conus rarimaculatus G. B. Sowerby II, 1870: synonym of Conasprella sieboldii (Reeve, 1848)
 Conus ravus Gould, 1853: synonym of Californiconus californicus (Reeve, 1844)
 Conus reevei Kiener, 1845: synonym of Conus vittatus Hwass in Bruguière, 1792
 Conus reflectus G. B. Sowerby III, 1877: synonym of Conus catus Hwass in Bruguière, 1792
 Conus reflexus G. B. Sowerby III, 1887: synonym of Conus catus Hwass in Bruguière, 1792
 Conus regalitatis G. B. Sowerby I, 1834: synonym of Conus purpurascens G. B. Sowerby I, 1833
 Conus regius Hwass in Bruguière, 1792: synonym of Conus princeps Linnaeus, 1758
 Conus regus: synonym of Conus princeps Linnaeus, 1758
 Conus remo Brazier, 1898: synonym of Conus anemone Lamarck, 1810
 Conus reteaureum Perry, 1811: synonym of Conus textile Linnaeus, 1758
 Conus reticularis Bory de Saint Vincent, 1827: synonym of Conus mercator Linnaeus, 1758
 Conus reticulatus Perry, 1811: synonym of Conus araneosus [Lightfoot], 1786
 Conus reticulatus Born, 1778: synonym of Conus mercator Linnaeus, 1758
 Conus reticulatus G. B. Sowerby I, 1834: synonym of Conasprella lucida (W. Wood, 1828)
 Conus rhododendron Jay, 1839: synonym of Conus adamsonii Broderip, 1836
 Conus richardi Fenaux, 1942: synonym of Conus fumigatus Hwass in Bruguière, 1792
 Conus rikae (Petuch & Berschauer, 2018): synonym of Conus mercator Linnaeus, 1758
 Conus riosi Petuch, 1986: synonym of Conus daucus riosi Petuch, 1986
 Conus rivularius Reeve, 1849: synonym of Conus boeticus Reeve, 1844
 Conus roatanensis Petuch & Sargent, 2011: synonym of Conasprella roatanensis (Petuch & Sargent, 2011) 
 Conus roberti Richard, 2009: synonym of Conasprella roberti (Richard, 2009) 
 Conus robillardi Bernardi, 1858: synonym of Conus vexillum Gmelin, 1791
 Conus rogmartini da Motta, 1982: synonym of Conasprella otohimeae (Kuroda & Itô, 1961)
 Conus rollandi Bernardi, 1860: synonym of Conus magus Linnaeus, 1758
 Conus roosevelti Bartsch & Rehder, 1939: synonym of Conus tiaratus G. B. Sowerby I, 1833
 Conus roquensis (Cossignani & Fiadeiro, 2015): synonym of Conus damottai Trovão, 1979
 Conus rosaceus Kiener, 1849: synonym of Conus iodostoma Reeve, 1843
 Conus rosaceus Dillwyn, 1817: synonym of Conus tinianus Hwass in Bruguière, 1792
 Conus rosaceus G. B. Sowerby I, 1834: synonym of Conasprella mindana (Hwass in Bruguière, 1792)
 Conus roseotinctus G. B. Sowerby II, 1866: synonym of Conus anemone Lamarck, 1810
 Conus roseus Fischer von Waldheim, 1807: synonym of Conus granulatus Linnaeus, 1758
 Conus roseus Lamarck, 1810: synonym of Conus biliosus (Röding, 1798)
 Conus rosiae (Monnier, Batifoix & Limpalaër, 2018): synonym of Conus behelokensis Lauer, 1989
 Conus rossiteri Brazier, 1870: synonym of Conus papilliferus G. B. Sowerby I, 1834
 Conus rubescens Bonnet, 1864: synonym of Conus canonicus Hwass in Bruguière, 1792
 Conus rubiginosus Hwass in Bruguière, 1792: synonym of Conus pennaceus Born, 1778
 Conus rubropennatus da Motta, 1982: synonym of Conus pennaceus Born, 1778
 Conus rudiae Magnotte, 1971: synonym of Conus patae Abbott, 1971
 Conus rudis Weinkauff, 1873: synonym of Conus ermineus Born, 1778
 Conus ruppellii Reeve, 1848: synonym of Conus boeticus Reeve, 1844
 Conus rusticus Linnaeus, 1758 (unaccepted, Nomenclaturally invalid name, placed on the Official Index of Invalid and Rejected Specific Names in Zoology (ICZN Opinion n°753))
 Conus rusticus Poli, 1826: synonym of Conus ventricosus Gmelin, 1791
 Conus rutilus Menke, 1843: synonym of Conasprella rutila (Menke, 1843) 
 Conus saecularis Melvill, 1898: synonym of Conasprella saecularis (Melvill, 1898) 
 Conus sagarinoi Fenzan, 2004: synonym of Conus terryni Tenorio & Poppe, 2004
 Conus sagei Korn & G. Raybaudi Massilia, 1993: synonym of Conasprella sagei (Korn & G. Raybaudi Massilia, 1993) 
 Conus sagittatus G. B. Sowerby II, 1865: synonym of Conus lemniscatus Reeve, 1849
 Conus sagittiferus G. B. Sowerby II, 1866: synonym of Conus lemniscatus Reeve, 1849
 Conus samiae da Motta, 1982: synonym of Conus sulcatus Hwass in Bruguière, 1792
 Conus sanctaemarthae Vink, 1977: synonym of Conus granarius Kiener, 1847
 Conus sanderi Wils & Moolenbeek, 1979: synonym of Conus villepinii P. Fischer & Bernardi, 1857
 Conus sanguinolentus Reeve, 1849: synonym of Conus daucus Hwass in Bruguière, 1792
 Conus sapphirostoma Weinkauff, 1874: synonym of Conus biliosus (Röding, 1798)
 Conus sargenti (Petuch, 2013): synonym of Conasprella sargenti (Petuch, 2013) 
 Conus sauros Garcia, 2006: synonym of Conasprella sauros (Garcia, 2006) 
 Conus sazanka Shikama, 1970: synonym of Conus martensi E. A. Smith, 1884
 Conus scaber Kiener, 1847: synonym of Conus miliaris Hwass in Bruguière, 1792
 Conus scaber Link, 1807: synonym of Conasprella puncticulata (Hwass in Bruguière, 1792)
 Conus scabriusculus Dillwyn, 1817: synonym of Conus coffeae Gmelin, 1791
 Conus scariphus (Dall, 1910): synonym of Conasprella scaripha (Dall, 1910) 
 Conus schech Weinkauff, 1873: synonym of Conus locumtenens Blumenbach, 1791
 Conus schepmani Fulton, 1936: synonym of Conus comatosa Pilsbry, 1904: synonym of Conasprella comatosa (Pilsbry, 1904)
 Conus schirrmeisteri Coltro, 2004: synonym of Conasprella iansa (Petuch, 1979)
 Conus scitulus Reeve, 1849: synonym of Conus algoensis scitulus Reeve, 1849
 Conus scopulicola (Okutani, 1972): synonym of  Profundiconus scopulicola Okutani, 1972 
 Conus scriptus G. B. Sowerby II, 1858: synonym of Conus textile vaulberti Lorenz, 2012
 Conus secutor Crosse, 1865: synonym of Conus tinianus Hwass in Bruguière, 1792
 Conus segravei Gatliff, 1891: synonym of Conus clarus E. A. Smith, 1881
 Conus selectus A. Adams, 1855: synonym of Conus monilifer Broderip, 1833
 Conus selenae van Mol, Tursch & Kempf, 1967: synonym of Artemidiconus selenae (van Mol, Tursch & Kempf, 1967)
 Conus semisulcatus G. B. Sowerby II, 1870: synonym of Conus capreolus Röckel, 1985
 Conus semivelatus G. B. Sowerby III, 1882: synonym of Conus rattus Hwass in Bruguière, 1792
 Conus senator Linnaeus, 1758 (unaccepted, Nomenclaturally invalid name, placed on the Official Index of Invalid and Rejected Specific Names in Zoology (ICZN Opinion n°753))
 Conus seychellensis G. Nevill & H. Nevill, 1874: synonym of Conus litoglyphus Hwass in Bruguière, 1792
 Conus siamensis Hwass in Bruguière, 1792: synonym of Conus pulcher siamensis Hwass in Bruguière, 1792
 Conus siculus Delle Chiaje, 1828: synonym of Conus ventricosus Gmelin, 1791
 Conus sieboldii Reeve, 1848: synonym of Conasprella sieboldii (Reeve, 1848) 
 Conus signae Bartsch, 1937: synonym of Conus virgatus Reeve, 1849
 Conus signifer Crosse, 1865: synonym of Conus magus Linnaeus, 1758
 Conus simonei (Petuch & R. F. Myers, 2014): synonym of Conasprella simonei (Petuch & R. F. Myers, 2014) 
 Conus simonis Bozzetti, 2010: synonym of Conus striolatus Kiener, 1848 
 Conus simplex G. B. Sowerby II, 1858: synonym of Conus algoensis simplex G. B. Sowerby II, 1858
 Conus sindon Reeve, 1844: synonym of Conus omaria Hwass in Bruguière, 1792
 Conus sinensis G. B. Sowerby I, 1841: synonym of Conus praecellens A. Adams, 1855
 Conus sirventi Fenaux, 1943: synonym of Conus textile Linnaeus, 1758
 Conus skinneri da Motta, 1982: synonym of Conus nobilis skinneri da Motta, 1982
 Conus smirna Bartsch & Rehder, 1943: synonym of  Profundiconus smirna (Bartsch & Rehder, 1943) 
 Conus smithi Angas, 1877: synonym of Conasprella rutila (Menke, 1843)
 Conus soaresi Trovão, 1978: synonym of Conus cloveri Walls, 1978
 Conus solandri Broderip & G. B. Sowerby I, 1830: synonym of Conus coccineus Gmelin, 1791
 Conus solidus G. B. Sowerby I, 1841: synonym of Conus retifer Menke, 1829
 Conus somalicus (Bozzetti, 2013): synonym of Conasprella somalica (Bozzetti, 2013) 
 Conus sophiae Brazier, 1875: synonym of Conus ferrugineus Hwass in Bruguière, 1792
 Conus sorenseni Sander, 1982: synonym of Conus sanderi Wils & Moolenbeek, 1979
 Conus sowerbii Reeve, 1849: synonym of Conus praecellens A. Adams, 1855
 Conus sowerbyi G. B. Sowerby II, 1857: synonym of Conus praecellens A. Adams, 1855
 Conus sozoni Bartsch, 1939: synonym of Conasprella delessertii (Récluz, 1843)
 Conus speciosissimus Reeve, 1848: synonym of Conus magellanicus Hwass in Bruguière, 1792
 Conus speciosus G. B. Sowerby II, 1857: synonym of Conus cardinalis Hwass in Bruguière, 1792
 Conus spectabilis A. Adams, 1855: synonym of Conus artoptus G. B. Sowerby I, 1833
 Conus spiculum Reeve, 1849: synonym of Conus generalis Linnaeus, 1767
 Conus spirofilis Habe & Kosuge, 1970: synonym of Conasprella spirofilis (Habe & Kosuge, 1970) 
 Conus spirogloxus Deshayes, 1863: synonym of Conus maldivus Hwass in Bruguière, 1792
 Conus spurius (Röding, 1798): synonym of Conus regius Gmelin, 1791
 Conus stainforthii Reeve, 1843: synonym of Conus moluccensis Küster, 1838
 Conus stearnsianus (Raymond, 1904): synonym of Megasurcula stearnsiana (Raymond, 1904)
 Conus stearnsii Conrad, 1869: synonym of Conasprella stearnsii (Conrad, 1869) 
 Conus stellatus Kiener, 1847: synonym of Conus pennaceus Born, 1778
 † Conus stenostoma G. B. Sowerby I, 1850: synonym of † Conasprella stenostoma (G. B. Sowerby I, 1850) 
 Conus stercutius Nardo, 1847: synonym of Conus ventricosus Gmelin, 1791
 Conus sticticus A. Adams, 1855: synonym of Conasprella jaspidea pealii (Green, 1830)
 Conus stigmaticus A. Adams, 1855: synonym of Conus collisus Reeve, 1849
 Conus stillatus Reeve, 1849: synonym of Conus spectrum Linnaeus, 1758
 Conus stocki Coomans & Moolenbeek, 1990: synonym of Conasprella stocki (Coomans & Moolenbeek, 1990) 
 Conus strigatus Hwass in Bruguière, 1792: synonym of Conus australis Holten, 1802
 Conus subacutus Fenaux, 1942: synonym of Conus amadis Gmelin, 1791
 Conus subcapitaneus Link, 1807: synonym of Conus litoglyphus Hwass in Bruguière, 1792
 Conus subcarinatus G. B. Sowerby II, 1865: synonym of Conus malacanus Hwass in Bruguière, 1792
 Conus subfloridus da Motta, 1985: synonym of Conus striatus striatus Linnaeus, 1758
 Conus submediterraneus Locard, 1886: synonym of Conus ventricosus Gmelin, 1791
 Conus subroseus Röckel & Korn, 1992: synonym of Conus lischkeanus Weinkauff, 1875
 Conus substitutus Link, 1807: synonym of Conus locumtenens Blumenbach, 1791
 Conus succinctus A. Adams, 1855: synonym of Conus infrenatus Reeve, 1848
 Conus suffusus G. B. Sowerby II, 1870: synonym of Conus marmoreus Linnaeus, 1758
 Conus sugillatus Reeve, 1844: synonym of Conus muriculatus G. B. Sowerby I, 1833
 Conus sulcatus Link, 1807: synonym of Conasprella jaspidea (Gmelin, 1791)
 Conus sulcatus Mühlfeld, 1816: synonym of Conasprella jaspidea pealii (Green, 1830)
 Conus sulciferus A. Adams, 1855: synonym of Conus ochroleucus tmetus Tomlin, 1937
 Conus sulphuratus Kiener, 1846: synonym of Conus vexillum Gmelin, 1791
 Conus suluensis Shikama, 1979: synonym of Conus tribblei Walls, 1977
 Conus sumatrensis Hwass in Bruguière, 1792: synonym of Conus vexillum Gmelin, 1791 
 Conus superscriptus G. B. Sowerby III, 1877: synonym of Conus iodostoma Reeve, 1843
 Conus superstriatus G. B. Sowerby II, 1858: synonym of Conus anemone Lamarck, 1810
 Conus surinamensis Hwass in Bruguière, 1792: synonym of Conus mappa [Lightfoot], 1786
 Conus sutoreanus Weinkauff, 1875: synonym of Conus gubernator Hwass in Bruguière, 1792
 Conus suzannae van Rossum, 1990: synonym of Conus textile Linnaeus, 1758
 Conus syriacus G. B. Sowerby I, 1833: synonym of Conus regularis G. B. Sowerby I, 1833
 Conus tahitiensis Dautzenberg, 1932: synonym of Conus rattus Hwass in Bruguière, 1792
 Conus taitensis Hwass in Bruguière, 1792: synonym of Conus rattus Hwass in Bruguière, 1792
 Conus tamikoae Shikama, 1973: synonym of Conus kinoshitai (Kuroda, 1956)
 Conus tarafensis (Cossignani & Fiadeiro, 2018): synonym of Conus fuscoflavus Röckel, Rolán & Monteiro, 1980
 Conus tamsianus Dunker, 1853: synonym of Conus aemulus Reeve, 1844
 Conus tarava Rabiller & Richard, 2014: synonym of Profundiconus tarava (Rabiller & Richard, 2014): synonym of Profundiconus teramachii (Kuroda, 1956)
 Conus taslei Kiener, 1845: synonym of Conus guinaicus Hwass in Bruguière, 1792
 Conus tasmaniae G. B. Sowerby II, 1866: synonym of Conus magus Linnaeus, 1758
 Conus tasmanicus Tenison-Woods, 1876: synonym of Conasprella rutila (Menke, 1843)
 Conus taylorianus E. A. Smith, 1880: synonym of Conus exiguus Lamarck, 1810
 Conus tegulatus G. B. Sowerby II, 1870: synonym of Conus inscriptus Reeve, 1843
 Conus tendineus Hwass in Bruguière, 1792: synonym of Conus violaceus Gmelin, 1791
 Conus tenellus Holten, 1802: synonym of Conus nimbosus Hwass in Bruguière, 1792
 Conus tenellus Dillwyn, 1817: synonym of Conus nimbosus Hwass in Bruguière, 1792
 Conus tenuis G. B. Sowerby I, 1833: synonym of Conus tinianus Hwass in Bruguière, 1792
 Conus tenuis G. B. Sowerby II, 1857: synonym of Conus floridulus A. Adams & Reeve, 1848
 Conus tenuisulcatus G. B. Sowerby II, 1873: synonym of Conus balteatus G. B. Sowerby I, 1833
 Conus teramachii (Kuroda, 1956): synonym of  Profundiconus teramachii (Kuroda, 1956) 
 Conus terebellum Linnaeus, 1758: synonym of Terebellum terebellum (Linnaeus, 1758)
 Conus terebellum (Röding, 1798): synonym of Conus circumcisus Born, 1778
 Conus terebellum Gmelin, 1791: synonym of Conus terebra Born, 1778
 Conus terminus Lamarck, 1822: synonym of Conus gubernator Hwass in Bruguière, 1792
 Conus testudinarius Hwass in Bruguière, 1792: synonym of Conus ermineus Born, 1778
 Conus tevesi Trovão, 1978: synonym of Conus alexandrinus Kaicher, 1977 
 Conus textilinus Kiener, 1847: synonym of Conus textile archiepiscopus Hwass in Bruguière, 1792: synonym of Conus textile Linnaeus, 1758
 Conus thailandis da Motta, 1978: synonym of Conus crocatus thailandis da Motta, 1978
 Conus thomasi G. B. Sowerby III, 1881: synonym of Conus terebra Born, 1778
 Conus thuscus Nardo, 1847: synonym of Conus ventricosus Gmelin, 1791
 Conus tigrinus G. B. Sowerby II, 1858: synonym of Conus textile Linnaeus, 1758
 Conus tiki Moolenbeek, Zandbergen & Bouchet, 2008: synonym of Conasprella tiki (Moolenbeek, Zandbergen & Bouchet, 2008)
 Conus tirardi Röckel & Moolenbeek, 1996: synonym of Conasprella tirardi (Röckel & Moolenbeek, 1996)
 Conus tornatus G. B. Sowerby I, 1833: synonym of Conasprella tornata (G. B. Sowerby I, 1833) 
 Conus torquatus Martens, 1901: synonym of Profundiconus teramachii (Kuroda, 1956)
 Conus tosaensis Shikama, 1970: synonym of Conasprella articulata (G. B. Sowerby II, 1873)
 Conus traillii A. Adams, 1855: synonym of Pygmaeconus traillii (A. Adams, 1855) 
 Conus traversianus E. A. Smith, 1875: synonym of  Conasprella traversiana (E. A. Smith, 1875) 
 Conus tremperianus (Dall, 1911): synonym of Megasurcula carpenteriana (Gabb, 1865)
 Conus tribunus Crosse, 1865: synonym of Conus hyaena Hwass in Bruguière, 1792
 Conus tribunus Gmelin, 1791: synonym of Conasprella centurio (Born, 1778)
 Conus trinitarius Hwass in Bruguière, 1792: synonym of Conus mappa trinitarius Hwass in Bruguière, 1792
 Conus tropicensis Coomans & Filmer, 1985: synonym of Conus lischkeanus Weinkauff, 1875
 Conus trunculus Monterosato, 1899: synonym of Conus ventricosus Gmelin, 1791
 Conus tryoni Heilprin, 1887 †: synonym of Contraconus tryoni (Heilprin, 1887) †
 Conus tuberculosus Tomlin, 1938: synonym of Profundiconus tuberculosus (Tomlin, 1937) 
 Conus turbinatus G. B. Sowerby II, 1858: synonym of Conus suturatus Reeve, 1844
 Conus turriculatus G. B. Sowerby II, 1866: synonym of Conus acutangulus Lamarck, 1810
 Conus turritinus da Motta, 1985: synonym of Conus furvus Reeve, 1843
 Conus turritus G. B. Sowerby II, 1870: synonym of Conus gradatulus Weinkauff, 1875
 Conus turschi da Motta, 1985: synonym of Conus consors G. B. Sowerby I, 1833
 Conus undatus Kiener, 1847: synonym of Conus spurius lorenzianus Dillwyn, 1817
 Conus undulatus G. B. Sowerby II, 1858: synonym of Conus sulcatus Hwass in Bruguière, 1792
 Conus undulatus [Lightfoot], 1786: synonym of Conus textile Linnaeus, 1758
 Conus unicolor G. B. Sowerby I, 1834: synonym of Conus hyaena concolor G. B. Sowerby II, 1841
 Conus unicolor G. B. Sowerby I, 1833: synonym of Conus circumcisus Born, 1778
 Conus ustickei J. P. Miller in Nowell-Usticke, 1959: synonym of Conus attenuatus Reeve, 1844
 Conus ustulatus Reeve, 1844: synonym of Conus magus Linnaeus, 1758
 Conus vanhyningi (Rehder, 1944): synonym of Conasprella vanhyningi (Rehder, 1944) 
 Conus varandinhensis (Cossignani & Fiadeiro, 2017): synonym of Conus boavistensis Rolán & F. Fernandes, 1990
 Conus vaubani Röckel, Richard & Moolenbeek, 1995: synonym of Profundiconus vaubani (Röckel & Moolenbeek, 1995) 
 Conus vayssetianus Crosse, 1872: synonym of Conus exiguus Lamarck, 1810
 Conus veillardi da Motta, 1990: synonym of Conus gubernator Hwass in Bruguière, 1792
 Conus vermiculatus Lamarck, 1822: synonym of Conus chaldaeus (Röding, 1798)
 Conus verreauxii Kiener, 1846: synonym of Conus spectrum Linnaeus, 1758
 Conus verriculum Reeve, 1843: synonym of Conus textile Linnaeus, 1758
 Conus verrucosus Hwass in Bruguière, 1792: synonym of Conus jaspideus pealii Green, 1830: synonym of Conasprella jaspidea pealii (Green, 1830)
 Conus verulosus Hwass in Bruguière, 1792: synonym of Conus granulatus Linnaeus, 1758
 Conus vespertinus G. B. Sowerby I, 1825: synonym of Conus timorensis Hwass in Bruguière, 1792
 Conus viaderi Fenaux, 1942: synonym of Conus locumtenens Blumenbach, 1791
 Conus vicarius Linnaeus, 1767: synonym of Conus ammiralis Linnaeus, 1758
 Conus vicarius (Röding, 1798): synonym of Conus locumtenens Blumenbach, 1791
 Conus vicarius Lamarck, 1810: synonym of Conus ammiralis Linnaeus, 1758
 Conus vicdani Kosuge, 1980: synonym of Conus sulcocastaneus Kosuge, 1981
 Conus vikingorum Petuch, 1993: synonym of Conus daucus Hwass in Bruguière, 1792
 Conus vimineus Reeve, 1849: synonym of  Conasprella viminea (Reeve, 1849) 
 Conus vinctus A. Adams, 1855: synonym of Conus monachus Linnaeus, 1758
 Conus violaceus Reeve, 1844: synonym of Conus viola Cernohorsky, 1977
 Conus violaceus Link, 1807: synonym of Conus glans Hwass in Bruguière, 1792
 Conus viperinus Lauer, 1986: synonym of Conus omaria Hwass in Bruguière, 1792
 Conus virgineus Link, 1807: synonym of Conus coronatus Gmelin, 1791
 Conus viridis G. B. Sowerby II, 1857: synonym of Conus rattus Hwass in Bruguière, 1792
 Conus viridulus Lamarck, 1810: synonym of Conus imperialis Linnaeus, 1758
 Conus visseri Delsaerdt, 1990: synonym of Pygmaeconus visseri (Delsaerdt, 1990) 
 Conus vitulinus Hwass in Bruguière, 1792: synonym of Conus planorbis Born, 1778
 Conus vulpinus Hwass in Bruguière, 1792: synonym of Conus planorbis Born, 1778
 Conus vulpinus Schubert & Wagner, 1829: synonym of Conus planorbis Born, 1778
 Conus wakayamaensis (Kuroda, 1956): synonym of Conasprella wakayamaensis (Kuroda, 1956)
 Conus wallacei (Lorenz & Morrison, 2004): synonym of Pygmaeconus wallacei (Lorenz & Morrison, 2004) 
 Conus waterhouseae Brazier, 1896: synonym of Conus distans Hwass in Bruguière, 1792
 Conus weinkauffii Löbbecke, 1882: synonym of Conus spurius Gmelin, 1791
 Conus wendrosi (Tenorio & Afonso, 2013): synonym of Conasprella wendrosi (Tenorio & Afonso, 2013) 
 Conus whiteheadae da Motta, 1985: synonym of Conus sugimotonis Kuroda, 1928
 Conus wilmeri G. B. Sowerby III, 1882: synonym of Conus acutangulus Lamarck, 1810
 Conus wistaria Shikama, 1970: synonym of Conus fulmen Reeve, 1843
 Conus wolof (Petuch & Berschauer, 2018): synonym of Conus guinaicus Hwass in Bruguière, 1792
 Conus woolseyi M. Smith, 1946: synonym of Conasprella centurio (Born, 1778)
 Conus worcesteri Brazier, 1891: synonym of Conus magus Linnaeus, 1758
 Conus worki Petuch, 1998: synonym of Conus daucus riosi Petuch, 1986
 Conus ximenes Gray, 1839: synonym of Conasprella ximenes (Gray, 1839)
 Conus yemanjae van Mol, Tursch & Kempf, 1967: synonym of Artemidiconus selenae (van Mol, Tursch & Kempf, 1967)
 Conus zealandicus Hutton, 1873: synonym of Conus ventricosus Gmelin, 1791
 Conus zeylandicus [sic]: synonym of Conus zeylanicus Gmelin, 1791
 Conus zukiae Shikama, 1979: synonym of Conus mustelinus Hwass in Bruguière, 1792
 Conus zulu Petuch, 1979: synonym of Conus betulinus Linnaeus, 1758

Nomina dubia 
This a list of species in Conus that have a doubtful name (nomen dubium)

Conus abbotti Clench, 1942 (after R. Tucker Abbott) (nomen dubium)
Conus albidus Schröter, 1803 (nomen dubium)
Conus amethysteus Link, 1807 (nomen dubium)
Conus argillaceus Perry, 1811(nomen dubium)
Conus bandatus Perry, 1811 (nomen dubium)
Conus bicinctus Donovan, 1826 (nomen dubium)
Conus cinereus Schröter, 1803 (nomen dubium)
Conus clandestinus Shikama, 1979 (nomen dubium)
Conus coralloides Perry, 1811 (nomen dubium)
Conus costatus Gmelin, 1791 (nomen dubium)
Conus fasciatus Schröter, 1803 (nomen dubium)
Conus felinus Link, 1807 (nomen dubium)
Conus ferrugatus G. B. Sowerby I, 1834 (nomen dubium)
Conus feruginosus Mawe, 1823 (nomen dubium)
Conus fritillaria Lichtenstein, 1794 (nomen dubium)
Conus fulgurans Hwass in Bruguière, 1792 (nomen dubium)
Conus fulmineus Gmelin, 1791 (nomen dubium)
Conus fulvus Schröter, 1803 (nomen dubium)
Conus gigas Fischer von Waldheim, 1807 (nomen dubium)
Conus guienensis Schröter, 1803 (nomen nudum)
Conus japonicus Hwass in Bruguière, 1792 (nomen dubium)
Conus lacteus Reeve, 1844 (nomen dubium)
Conus laevigatus Link, 1807 (nomen dubium)
Conus lamellosus Hwass in Bruguière, 1792 (nomen dubium)
Conus lar Lichtenstein, 1794 (nomen dubium)
Conus leaeneus Link, 1807 (nomen dubium)
Conus lemur Lichtenstein, 1794 (nomen dubium)
Conus marmoratus Schröter, 1803 (nomen dubium)
Conus maurus King, 1826 (nomen dubium)
Conus melancholicus Lamarck, 1810 (nomen dubium)
Conus minimus Hwass in Bruguière, 1792 (nomen dubium)
Conus niveus Gmelin, 1791 (nomen dubium)
Conus oculatus Gmelin, 1791 (nomen dubium)
Conus olea Schröter, 1803 (nomen dubium)
Conus papillaris G. B. Sowerby II, 1833 (nomen dubium)
Conus pardalinus Link, 1807 (nomen dubium)
Conus phoebeus Jousseaume, 1894 (nomen dubium)
Conus porcellaneus Fischer von Waldheim, 1807 (nomen dubium)
Conus puniceus Schröter, 1803 (nomen dubium)
Conus rubescens Schröter, 1803 (nomen dubium)
Conus sardus Link, 1807 (nomen dubium)
Conus scriptus Deshayes, 1831 (nomen dubium)
Conus strigatus Hwass in Bruguière, 1792 (nomen dubium)
 Conus submarginatus G. B. Sowerby II, 1870 (nomen dubium)
Conus tristis Reeve, 1844 (nomen dubium)
Conus unicolor G. B. Sowerby II, 1833 (nomen dubium)
Conus virgineus Link, 1807 (nomen dubium)
Conus vitifera Perry, 1811 (nomen dubium)
Conus vividus G. B. Sowerby III, 1914 (nomen dubium)

References

External links
 Tenorio, M. J., Abalde, S., Pardos-Blas, J. R., & Zardoya, R. (2020). Taxonomic revision of West African cone snails (Gastropoda: Conidae) based upon mitogenomic studies: implications for conservation. European Journal of Taxonomy, (663). https://doi.org/10.5852/ejt.2020.663

Conus